= Frequent pattern discovery =

Technique for database mining

Frequent pattern discovery (or FP discovery, FP mining, or Frequent itemset mining) is part of knowledge discovery in databases, Massive Online Analysis, and data mining; it describes the task of finding the most frequent and relevant patterns in large datasets. The concept was first introduced for mining transaction databases. Frequent patterns are defined as subsets (itemsets, subsequences, or substructures) that appear in a data set with frequency no less than a user-specified or auto-determined threshold.

== Techniques ==
Techniques for FP mining include:

- market basket analysis
- cross-marketing
- catalog design
- clustering
- classification
- recommendation systems

For the most part, FP discovery can be done using association rule learning with particular algorithms Eclat, FP-growth and the Apriori algorithm.

Other strategies include:

- Frequent subtree mining
- Structure mining
- Sequential pattern mining

and respective specific techniques.

Implementations exist for various machine learning systems or modules like MLlib for Apache Spark.
