= Temporal bias =

Bias which mixes cause and effect

In statistics and machine learning, temporal bias is an error or distortion in reasoning, data analysis, or predictive modeling that occurs when the timing of events or data collection is handled improperly or ignored. The concept is recognized across different disciplines, including epidemiology, machine learning, and cognitive psychology. Its exact definition and implications may vary by field.

== Causal inference ==
In epidemiology, temporal bias occurs when a study design cannot establish the correct sequence of events between an exposure and an outcome. It is sometimes referred to as temporal ambiguity or reverse causation. Establishing temporality is a major criterion for causal inference.

This bias is common in observational research, such as cross-sectional studies, where variables are measured simultaneously at a single point in time. For example, if a cross-sectional study finds an association between education level and health outcomes, researchers may be unable to determine whether lower education led to poor health or if poor health led to lower education. Temporal bias can also occur in case-control studies when the time period from which the data is drawn does not accurately represent the timeline clinicians experience during the actual diagnostic process. This misalignment can also inflate the predictive power of variables that appear close to the time of an outcome, which will undermine the reliability of the study's predictions.

A form of temporal bias is spurious correlation resulting from time, where non-causal associations in data may appear as the result of shared connections to time.

== Artificial intelligence ==
In machine learning and artificial intelligence, temporal bias can manifest as experimental evaluation errors or as historical bias within training data.

When evaluating models, temporal bias occurs if the training and testing datasets are randomly split without respecting the chronological order of the data. This incorrect time split allows the model to learn from future information that would not logically be available in a real-world deployment, leading to artificially inflated performance metrics. This may also indirectly lead to an ambiguous knowledge cutoff.

Additionally, temporal bias occurs when training data reflects historical inequalities or biases that existed during data collection, rather than the current context. For example, an artificial intelligence hiring system trained on historical employment data may perpetuate past inequalities if certain demographics were historically underrepresented in high-level roles.

== Human psychology ==
In cognitive psychology, temporal biases may describe how human perception and decision-making are distorted by time. A primary form is a bias towards the near future, where individuals overvalue immediate events and undervalue long term or past consequences, which influences their delay of gratification.

Temporal bias also manifests as temporal distortion, where individuals inaccurately perceive the progression or duration of time based on emotional states. For example, studies have shown that fear-inducing stimuli may cause temporal overestimation, meaning individuals will perceive threatening events as lasting longer than they actually do due to emotion-specific temporal biases.

== See also ==
- Algorithmic bias
- Causality
- Cognitive bias
- Concept drift
- Confounding
- Selection bias
- Time preference
