= PFA =

PFA or Pfa may refer to:

== Organizations ==
- Pacific Film Archive, now part of the Berkeley Art Museum and Pacific Film Archive (BAM/PFA)
- People for Animals, Indian animal welfare organisation
- PFA Footcare Association (Canadian Chapter)
- Police Federation of Australia
- Policía Federal Argentina, the Argentine Federal Police
- Popular Flying Association, a former name of the Light Aircraft Association
- Popular Front of Azerbaijan, forerunner of the Popular Front Party of Azerbaijan (PFPA)
- Professional Fraternity Association

== Science, technology, and mathematics ==
=== Chemistry and materials science ===
- Paraformaldehyde, a fixation solution
- Perfluoroalkoxy alkane, a plastic or polymer resin
- Pulverised fuel ash, a waste product of pulverised coal
- Parafluoroamphetamine
- Performic acid
- See also PFAS, Per- and polyfluoroalkyl substances

=== Computer science ===
- Probabilistic finite automaton
- .pfa, Printer Font ASCII, a file extension for PostScript Printer Font ASCII
- Predictive failure analysis, a technology for hard disk health monitoring, the predecessor of S.M.A.R.T.
- Portable Format for Analytics, a JSON-based file format for encoding data analytics, such as data mining models.
- PFA, an email abbreviation for "Please Find Attached" or "Please Find the Attachment"

=== Mathematics and statistics ===
- Prime-factor FFT algorithm, a fast algorithm for computing the discrete Fourier transform
- Proper forcing axiom
- Probability of False Alarm, a synonym for false positive rate which is commonly used in radar and related fields

== Sport ==
- Pahang FA, a Malaysian association football club
- Palestinian Football Association
- Perak FA, a Malaysian association football club
- Pickleball Federation of the Americas, a "continental" sport oversight organization
- Professional Footballers' Association, the English and Welsh association football trade union
- Professional Footballers Australia, the Australian soccer trade union

== Other uses ==
- Protection from abuse order
- Psychological first aid
