= Customer value maximization =

Marketing service model

Customer value maximization (CVM) is a real-time service model that, proponents say, goes beyond basic customer relationship management (CRM) capabilities, identifying and capturing maximum potential from prospective and existing customers.

== Customer-centricity ==
The CVM framework evaluates current methods and effectiveness, makes changes where required, and sets up a measurement system that helps in evaluating effectiveness. The CVM framework operates as a continuous process in a closed loop.

The CVM framework is closely related to the idea of customer-lifetime-value.

One of the strategies to maximize the value that each customer generates is to split customers into defined segments, a process called client segmentation.

== Marketing challenges ==
Marketing challenges can be predominantly dissected into four categories:

- Lifecycle challenges include driving usage of a product/service, new client acquisition, enabling cross-sell, up-sell, client retention, activation, usage, churn prevention, etc.
- Segment-based challenges Companies will reach out to each customer in a different way to suit their needs, especially when the company has multiple products/product variants. They need to reach out in a focused manner to independent segments that require varying strategies.
- Channel-based challenges Most companies adopt a multi-channel strategy in order to take their products or services to their customers. Each channel (store, online, mobile, etc.) needs to be tackled differently to ensure maximization of results. The increasing number of touch-points that each customer faces, has led marketers to grow increasingly reliant on machine-learning and AI models when calculating CVM models.
- Function-based challenges When companies invest in marketing programs, they look for methods that help them evaluate and track how they work and measure ROI. Systems to manage their programs, maximize results and optimize spends are all that companies keep looking for.

== Features ==
- Growth in value

== See also ==
- Brand engagement
- Business case
- Business model
- Cross-selling
- Customer centricity
- Customer data integration
- Customer Data Platform
- Customer experience
- Customer experience transformation
- Customer intelligence
- Customer relationship management (CRM)
- Guided selling
- Loyalty marketing
- Online lead generation
- Real-time marketing
- Relationship marketing
- Sales force management system
- Selling technique
- Strategic management
- Supplier relationship management
- Support automation
- Trigger-based marketing
- Up-selling
- Value-added selling
