= Uplift =

Uplift may refer to:

== Science ==
=== Geology ===
- Orogeny, also known as geologic uplift, a mountain-building process that takes place at a convergent plate margin
- Tectonic uplift, the geologic uplift of Earth's surface attributed to plate tectonics
- Epeirogenic movement, isostatic uplift or sinking of land
- Uplift mountains, the result of orogeny

=== Astrophysics ===
- Star lifting, also known as stellar uplift, the theoretical prospect of moving a stellar mass

== Business ==
- Uplift factor, or simply "uplift", adjustments to employee benefits
- Uplift modelling, in marketing campaigns, the difference in response rate between a treated group and a randomized control group
- Uplift enterprise computer access to heightened security protocols.

== Entertainment ==
- Uplift (science fiction), upgrading the capacities of a species or a civilization
  - Uplift Universe, the setting for a series of novels by David Brin
- Uplifting trance, a musical genre similar to progressive trance
- "Uplift", a song by Pantera from their 2000 album Reinventing the Steel

== Other uses ==
- Uplift Community High School, Chicago, Illinois, US
- Racial uplift, concept in African American cultural history
