= Data stream mining =

Analysis of continuous, rapid data

Data stream mining (also known as stream learning) is the process of extracting knowledge structures from continuous, rapid data records. A data stream is an ordered sequence of instances that in many applications of data stream mining can be read only once or a small number of times using limited computing and storage capabilities.

In many data stream mining applications, the goal is to predict the class or value of new instances in the data stream given some knowledge about the class membership or values of previous instances in the data stream. Machine learning techniques can be used to learn this prediction task from labeled examples in an automated fashion. Often, concepts from the field of incremental learning are applied to cope with structural changes, on-line learning and real-time demands. In many applications, especially operating within non-stationary environments, the distribution underlying the instances or the rules underlying their labeling may change over time, i.e. the goal of the prediction, the class to be predicted or the target value to be predicted, may change over time. This problem is referred to as concept drift. Detecting concept drift is a central issue to data stream mining. Other challenges that arise when applying machine learning to streaming data include: partially and delayed labeled data, recovery from concept drifts, and temporal dependencies.

Examples of data streams include computer network traffic, phone conversations, ATM transactions, web searches, and sensor data. Data stream mining can be considered a subfield of data mining, machine learning, and knowledge discovery.

== Learning from data streams ==
=== Learning methods ===
In incremental learning, a model is updated as new data arrive without repeatedly processing the full training history. One example is the Hoeffding tree, an incremental decision tree for classification. The Very Fast Decision Tree (VFDT) system implements this method and can learn from each example in a single pass without retaining individual examples in memory.

Each new labeled training example follows the tree's current tests to a leaf. The algorithm updates counts at that leaf that record how often each attribute value occurs with each class. It uses these counts to score candidate splits with a measure such as information gain. In the basic Hoeffding tree algorithm, the score of the leading candidate must exceed that of the runner-up by more than a threshold derived from the Hoeffding bound. The algorithm can also choose to leave the leaf unsplit. The threshold is

$$\epsilon = \sqrt{\frac{R^2 \ln(1/\delta)}{2n}},$$

where $R$ is the range of the split-scoring measure, $n$ is the number of examples seen at the leaf, and $\delta$ is the error probability used to set the bound. As more examples reach the leaf, the threshold decreases. Under the assumptions of the analysis, when the score gap exceeds the threshold, the leading candidate is the best choice at that leaf with probability at least $1-\delta$.

VFDT can limit memory use by deactivating leaves judged least promising for further growth. The original analysis assumes that examples come from a stationary distribution, and the authors identified adaptation to changing data as future work.

== Software for data stream mining ==
- MOA (Massive Online Analysis): free open-source software specific for mining data streams with concept drift developed in Java. It has several machine learning algorithms (classification, regression, clustering, outlier detection and recommender systems). Also, it contains a prequential evaluation method, the EDDM concept drift methods, a reader of ARFF real datasets, and artificial stream generators as SEA concepts, STAGGER, rotating hyperplane, random tree, and random radius based functions. MOA supports bi-directional interaction with Weka (machine learning).
- scikit-multiflow: A machine learning framework for multi-output/multi-label and stream data implemented in Python. scikit-multiflow contains stream generators, stream learning methods for single-target and multi-target, concept drift detectors, evaluation and visualisation methods. (This software is discontinued)
- StreamDM: StreamDM is an open source framework for big data stream mining that uses the Spark Streaming extension of the core Spark API. One advantage of StreamDM in comparison to existing frameworks is that it directly benefits from the Spark Streaming API, which handles much of the complex problems of the underlying data sources, such as out of order data and recovery from failures.
- RapidMiner: commercial software for knowledge discovery, data mining, and machine learning also featuring data stream mining, learning time-varying concepts, and tracking drifting concept (if used in combination with its data stream mining plugin (formerly: Concept Drift plugin))
- RiverML: River is a Python library for online machine learning. It is the result of a merger between creme and scikit-multiflow.
- GAENARI: C++ incremental decision tree. It continuously executes inserts and updates of chunked data sets. Rebuild support for concept drift issues.

== Events ==
- International Workshop on Ubiquitous Data Mining held in conjunction with the International Joint Conference on Artificial Intelligence (IJCAI) in Beijing, China, August 3–5, 2013.
- International Workshop on Knowledge Discovery from Ubiquitous Data Streams held in conjunction with the 18th European Conference on Machine Learning (ECML) and the 11th European Conference on Principles and Practice of Knowledge Discovery in Databases (PKDD) in Warsaw, Poland, in September 2007.
- ACM Symposium on Applied Computing Data Streams Track held in conjunction with the 2007 ACM Symposium on Applied Computing (SAC-2007) in Seoul, Korea, in March 2007.
- IEEE International Workshop on Mining Evolving and Streaming Data (IWMESD 2006) to be held in conjunction with the 2006 IEEE International Conference on Data Mining (ICDM-2006) in Hong Kong in December 2006.
- Fourth International Workshop on Knowledge Discovery from Data Streams (IWKDDS) to be held in conjunction with the 17th European Conference on Machine Learning (ECML) and the 10th European Conference on Principles and Practice of Knowledge Discovery in Databases (PKDD) (ECML/PKDD-2006) in Berlin, Germany, in September 2006.

== See also ==
- Concept drift
- Data Mining
- Sequence mining
- Streaming algorithm
- Stream processing
- Wireless sensor network
- Lambda architecture

== Books ==
- Bifet, Albert; Gavaldà, Ricard; Holmes, Geoff; Pfahringer, Bernhard (2018). Machine Learning for Data Streams with Practical Examples in MOA. Adaptive Computation and Machine Learning. MIT Press. p. 288. ISBN 9780262037792.
- Gama, João; Gaber, Mohamed Medhat, eds. (2007). Learning from Data Streams: Processing Techniques in Sensor Networks. Springer. p. 244. doi:10.1007/3-540-73679-4. ISBN 9783540736783.
- Ganguly, Auroop R.; Gama, João; Omitaomu, Olufemi A.; Gaber, Mohamed M.; Vatsavai, Ranga R., eds. (2008). Knowledge Discovery from Sensor Data. Industrial Innovation. CRC Press. p. 215. ISBN 9781420082326.
- Gama, João (2010). Knowledge Discovery from Data Streams. Data Mining and Knowledge Discovery. Chapman and Hall. p. 255. ISBN 9781439826119.
- Lughofer, Edwin (2011). Evolving Fuzzy Systems - Methodologies, Advanced Concepts and Applications. Studies in Fuzziness and Soft Computing. Vol. 266. Heidelberg: Springer. p. 456. doi:10.1007/978-3-642-18087-3. ISBN 9783642180866.
- Sayed-Mouchaweh, Moamar; Lughofer, Edwin, eds. (2012). Learning in Non-Stationary Environments: Methods and Applications. New York: Springer. p. 440. CiteSeerX 10.1.1.709.437. doi:10.1007/978-1-4419-8020-5. ISBN 9781441980199.
