= PMML =

PMML may refer to:

- Predictive Model Markup Language
- Pritzker Military Museum & Library, the Chicago institution
- Pakistan Markazi Muslim League, formerly Milli Muslim League, an Islamist political party in Pakistan, front for the militant group Lashkar-e-Taiba
