= Pattern search =

Pattern search may refer to:

- Pattern search (optimization)
- Pattern recognition (computing)
- Pattern recognition (psychology)
- Pattern mining
- String searching algorithm
- Fuzzy string searching
- Bitap algorithm
- K-optimal pattern discovery
- Nearest neighbor search
- Eyeball search
