= WINEPI =

Algorithm for data mining

In data mining, the WINEPI algorithm is an influential algorithm for episode mining, which helps discover the knowledge hidden in an event sequence.

WINEPI derives part of its name from the fact that it uses a sliding window to go through the event sequence.

The outcome of the algorithm are episode rules describe temporal relationships between events and form an extension of association rules.
