= Snyk =

Cybersecurity company

Snyk Limited
- Type: Private
- Industry: Computer security
- Founded: 2015; 11 years ago
- Founders: Guy Podjarny; Danny Grander; Assaf Hefetz
- Headquarters: Boston, Massachusetts, U.S.
- Key people: Peter McKay (CEO)
- Revenue: ▲US$309 million (2025)
- Net income: ▲ −US$176 million (2023)
- Number of employees: 1,400 (2022)
- Website: snyk.io

Snyk Limited is a developer-oriented cybersecurity company, specializing in securing custom-developed code, open-source dependencies and cloud infrastructure. It was founded in 2015 out of Tel Aviv and London and is headquartered in Boston.

== History ==
Snyk was founded in 2015 by Guy Podjarny (Hebrew: גיא פודחרני), Assaf Hefetz (אסף חפץ), and Danny Grander, (דני גרנדר) coming from Unit 8200, a SIGINT unit of the Israel Defense Forces. Podjarny started as CEO.

In July 2019, Peter McKay, one of the first investors, succeeded him, while Podjarny became president and chairman of the Board of Directors. In February 2026, McKay announced that he would step down as CEO once a successor was found.

In 2022, the company had approximately 1,400 employees. It also has offices in Tel Aviv, Ottawa, Zurich and London.

=== Acquisitions ===
Snyk acquisitions include:

- DeepCode (Sep-2020), which provided what became Snyk Code, a product for static application security testing. Snyk Code is a cloud-based, AI-powered code review platform that checks, tests, and debugs code. It uses machine learning to check for mistakes in code. The platform currently supports Apex, C#, C/C++, Go, Java, JavaScript, Kotlin, PHP, Python, Ruby, Scala, Swift, TypeScript, and Visual Basic (.NET).
- Manifold (Jan-2021), which was focused on software asset management.
- FossID (May-2021), which provided vulnerability scanning in C/C++ applications and the capability to identify pieces of code copied from the internet, e.g., from Stackoverflow, which could contain vulnerabilities. FossID was reacquired by the founders in September 2022 and is refocused on its core principles.
- CloudSkiff (Oct-2021), which was known for its open-source tool for drift detection (detection of changes in the outside environment which may invalidate software infrastructure configuration, database setup, etc.).
- Fugue (Feb-2022), which provided cloud security posture management (CSPM) solutions.
- Probely (Nov-2024), a start-up based in Porto, Portugal, focused on dynamic application security testing (DAST).
- Invariant Labs (Jun-2025), an AI security research firm, early pioneer in developing safeguards against emerging AI threats

=== Financing ===
In 2016, the company initially raised $3 million. In March 2018, its Series A funding was $7 million. In late 2019, it raised $70 million and a further $150 million in January 2020. In September 2021, a $300 million Series F funding round valued the company at $8.5 billion. This came six months after a valuation of $4.7 billion. Qatar Investment Authority led the next funding round in December 2022, with Snyk raising close to $200 million.

In December 2021, Bloomberg reported that Snyk was preparing for an IPO in 2022. As of July 2026, the company is privately held.

In January 2023, ServiceNow Inc. invested $25 million in Snyk.

== Products ==
The company's security products are designed to help software developers find weaknesses, violations, and vulnerabilities in their code. The company's vulnerability database records security issues found in open-source software libraries, and corrects the code. Security vulnerabilities are identified and addressed during the development process, before the software product is in use.
