= Massive Online Analysis =

MOA
- Developer: University of Waikato
- Stable release: 24.07.0 / 18 July 2024; 2 years ago
- Written in: Java
- Operating system: Cross-platform
- Type: Machine Learning
- License: GNU General Public License
- Website: moa.cms.waikato.ac.nz
- Repository: github.com/waikato/moa

Massive Online Analysis (MOA) is a free open-source software project specific for data stream mining with concept drift. It is written in Java and developed at the University of Waikato, New Zealand.

== Description ==
MOA is an open-source framework software that allows to build and run experiments of machine learning or data mining on evolving data streams. It includes a set of learners and stream generators that can be used from the graphical user interface (GUI), the command-line, and the Java API.

MOA contains several collections of machine learning algorithms:

- Classification
  - Bayesian classifiers
    - Naive Bayes
    - Naive Bayes Multinomial
  - Decision trees classifiers
    - Decision Stump
    - Hoeffding Tree
    - Hoeffding Option Tree
    - Hoeffding Adaptive Tree
  - Meta classifiers
    - Bagging
    - Boosting
    - Bagging using ADWIN
    - Bagging using Adaptive-Size Hoeffding Trees.
    - Perceptron Stacking of Restricted Hoeffding Trees
    - Leveraging Bagging
    - Online Accuracy Updated Ensemble
  - Function classifiers
    - Perceptron
    - Stochastic gradient descent (SGD)
    - Pegasos
  - Drift classifiers
    - Self-Adjusting Memory
    - Probabilistic Adaptive Windowing
  - Multi-label classifiers
  - Active learning classifiers
- Regression
  - FIMTDD
  - AMRules
- Clustering
  - StreamKM++
  - CluStream
  - ClusTree
  - D-Stream
  - CobWeb.
- Outlier detection
  - STORM
  - Abstract-C
  - COD
  - MCOD
  - AnyOut
- Recommender systems
  - BRISMFPredictor
- Frequent pattern mining
  - Itemsets
  - Graphs
- Change detection algorithms

These algorithms are designed for large scale machine learning, dealing with concept drift, and big data streams in real time.

MOA supports bi-directional interaction with Weka. MOA is free software released under the GNU GPL.

== See also ==
- Vowpal Wabbit
- List of numerical analysis software
