= Robert L. Grossman =

American computer scientist and bioinformatician

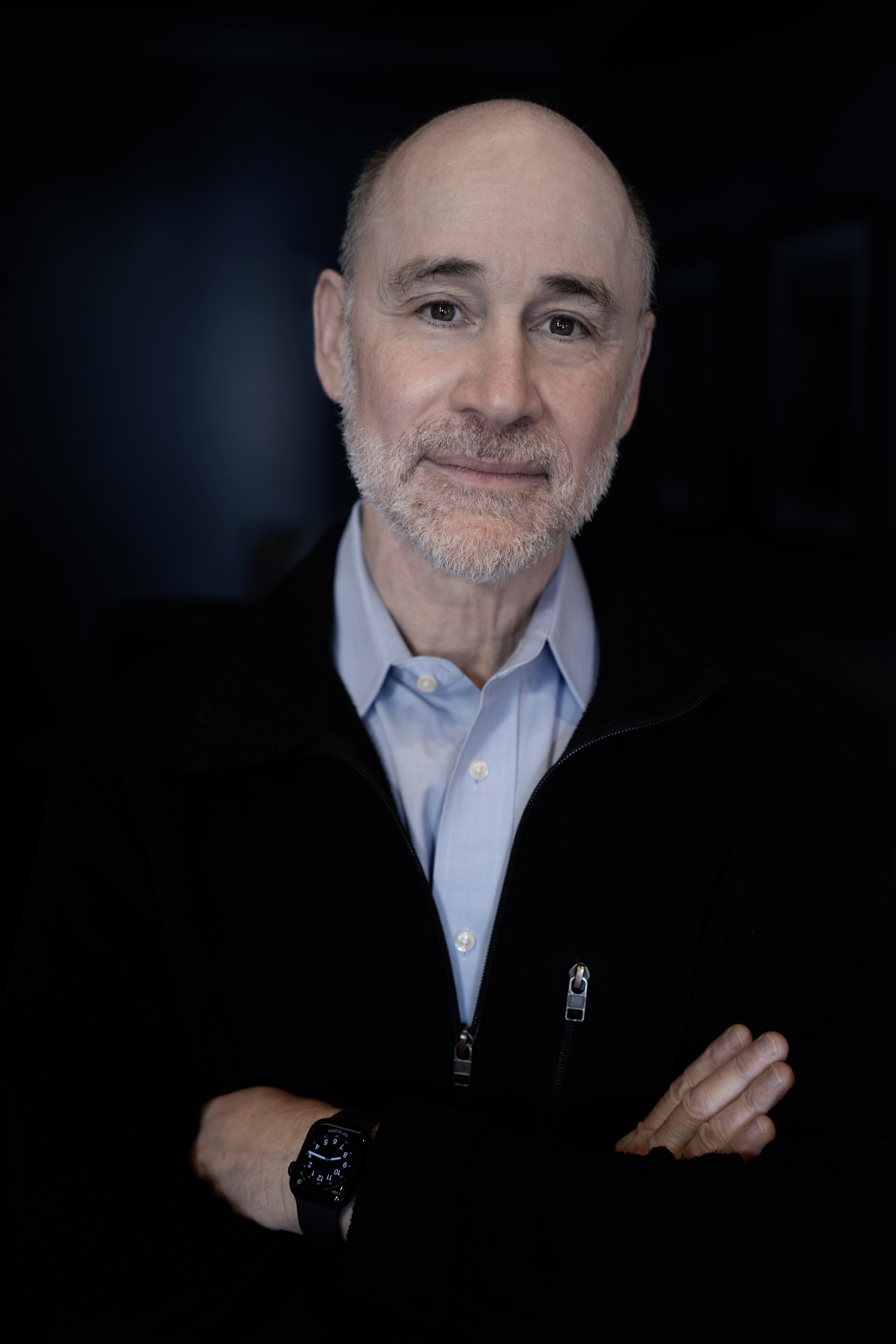
- Born: Robert Lee Grossman; Shaker Heights, Ohio, U.S.
- Education: Harvard University; Princeton University
- Scientific career
- Fields: Data science, computer science
- Workplaces: University of Chicago

Robert Lee Grossman is an American computer scientist and bioinformatician at the University of Chicago. His primary research interests are data science and data-intensive computing.

== Research ==
Grossman has worked in several fields. His early work (1984–1990) was in mathematics, where he developed algorithms in symbolic and numeric computing. In 1989, working with Richard Larson, he showed that trees have a natural multiplicative structure and are in fact a Hopf algebra. This algebra, sometimes called the Grossman–Larson algebra, is dual to the Connes-Kreimer algebra, which is one way of organizing the computations required when renormalizing Feynman diagrams. Working with Peter Crouch, he showed that there are Runge–Kutta methods that evolve naturally on Lie groups.

From 1990 to 2010, he primarily worked in computer science, specifically, data mining and data intensive computing. With Stuart Bailey and Yunhong Gu, he developed open source software to move large datasets over wide area high performance networks (PTool and the UDP-based Data Transfer Protocol or UDT). With Yunhong Gu, he also developed Sector/Sphere, a distributed platform for data intensive computing. During this period, he also founded the Data Mining Group, which develops data mining standards, and led the technical working group that developed the Predictive Model Markup Language (PMML), which is now the dominant standard in analytics.

Since 2010, he has primarily focused on data science and its applications to biology medicine, health care and the environment. He developed the first biomedical cloud that was designated as a NIH Trusted Partner, allowing it to interoperate with NIH's controlled access genomic data. He is currently leading the effort to build the NCI Genomic Data Commons, which will host all the genomic and associated clinical data from NIH/NCI funded research projects and clinical trials.

He is a faculty member at the University of Chicago and the Director of the Center for Data Intensive Science at the University of Chicago. He is the founder and director of the Open Commons Consortium.

== Entrepreneurial activity ==
Grossman founded Magnify, Inc. in 1996, was its CEO from 1996 to 2000, and its Chairman until 2005, when it was sold to ChoicePoint. Magnify is now part of LexisNexis. Magnify provided data mining solutions to the financial services sector. Grossman founded Open Data Group Inc. in 2001, which provides data science services so that clients can build predictive models over big data. Open Data's main product is a high performance scoring engine for statistics and analytic models that is compliant with the Portable Format for Analytics standard. Grossman is the Chief Data Scientist at Open Data Group.

== Education ==
Grossman was born in Shaker Heights, Ohio and attended Harvard University. He received an A.B. from Harvard University in 1980 and Ph.D. from Princeton University in 1985 from the Program in Applied and Computational Mathematics. He was a NSF Postdoctoral Research Fellow in the Mathematics Department at the University of California, Berkeley from 1984 to 1988.

== Awards and honors ==
Grossman is a Fellow of the American Association for the Advancement of Science. In 2017 he became a Fellow of the Association for Computing Machinery.
