= PFA Footcare Association (Canadian Chapter) =

PFA Footcare Association (Canadian Chapter) is a self-regulatory body which upholds, monitors and supports the competent and ethical practice of credentialed (Certified Pedorthist) members. Supporting the Canadian Pedorthic profession and improving the foot health of Canadians.

This association is one of 2 associations in Canada which confirm the validity of each member's designation(s) ensuring the members are trained to a common set of standards. Members are held accountable to: their respective governing body, standards of practice, code of ethics, continuing educational requirements as well as the PFA Footcare Association (Canadian Chapter) – Code of Conduct/Professional Responsibility governing this association.

All certified pedorthists holding a membership with this association must have met the pre-requisite requirements and hold a Certified Pedorthist credential (C.Ped/BOCPD/C.Ped (C)/C.Ped(MC)) from either the American Board for Certification in Orthotics, Prosthetics and Pedorthics (ABC), the Board of Certification/Accreditation (BOC) or the College of Pedorthics of Canada (CPC).

The pedorthic industry in Canada is not government regulated and it is associations like this, that the industry relies on to ensure the professionals serving the industry are properly trained and held accountable to the public.

PFA was founded in 1958 and has Certified Pedorthists practicing members in Canada, United States, and around the world.
