= Cross-selling =

Sales technique in which customers are sold additional products/services

Cross-selling is a sales technique involving the selling of an additional product or service to an existing customer. In practice, businesses define cross-selling in many different ways. Elements that might influence the definition might include the size of the business, the industry sector it operates within and the financial motivations of those required to define the term.

The objective of cross-selling can be either to increase the income derived from the client or to protect the relationship with the client or clients. The approach to the process of cross-selling can be varied to include two teams within the same organization or two organizations partnering to cross-sell or co-sell a client.

Unlike the acquiring of new business, cross-selling involves an element of risk that could disrupt the relationship of existing clients. For that reason, it is important to ensure that the additional product or service being sold to the client or clients enhances the value the client or clients get from the organization.

In practice, large businesses usually combine cross-selling and up-selling techniques to increase revenue.

== Professional services ==
For the vendor, the benefits are substantial. The most obvious example is an increase in revenue. There are also efficiency benefits in servicing one account rather than several. Most importantly, vendors that sell more services to a client are less likely to be displaced by a competitor. The more a client buys from a vendor, the higher the switching costs.

Though there are some ethical issues with most cross-selling, in some cases, they can be significant. Arthur Andersen's dealings with Enron provide a highly visible example. It is commonly felt that the firm's objectivity, being an auditor, was compromised by selling internal audit services and massive amounts of consulting work to the account.

Though most companies want more cross-selling, there can be substantial barriers:

1. A customer policy requiring the use of multiple vendors.
2. Having different purchasing points within an account, which reduce the ability to treat the customer like a single account.
3. The fear of the incumbent business unit that its colleagues would botch their work at the client, resulting in the loss of the account for all units of the firm.

Broadly speaking, cross-selling takes three forms. First, while servicing an account, the product or service provider may hear of an additional need, unrelated to the first, that the client has and offer to meet it. Thus, for example, in conducting an audit, an accountant is likely to learn about a range of needs for tax services, for valuation services and others. To the degree that regulations allow, the accountants may be able to sell services that meet these needs. This kind of cross-selling helped major accounting firms to expand their businesses considerably. Because of the potential for abuse, this kind of selling by auditors has been greatly curtailed under the Sarbanes-Oxley Act.

Selling add-on services is another form of cross-selling. That happens when a supplier convinces a customer that it can enhance the value of its service by buying another from a different part of the supplier's company. When one buys an appliance, the salesperson will offer to sell insurance beyond the terms of the warranty. Though common, that kind of cross-selling can leave a customer feeling poorly used. The customer might ask the appliance salesperson why he needs insurance on a brand new refrigerator, "Is it really likely to break in just nine months?"

The third kind of cross-selling can be called selling a solution. In this case, the customer buying air conditioners is sold a package of both the air conditioners and installation services. The customer can be considered buying relief from the heat, unlike just air conditioners.

== See also ==
- AIDA
- Bait and switch
- Choice architecture
- Contract of sale
- Customer value maximization
- List of marketing topics
- Marketing
- Permission marketing
- Predictive analytics
- Promotion
- Sales
- Selling technique
- Up-selling
- Value-added selling

== Sources ==
- Harding, Ford (2002). Cross-Selling Success. Avon, MA: Adams Media. p. 230. ISBN 1-58062-705-6.
- Wittmann, Georg (2006). Cross-Selling Financial Services to Small and Medium Enterprises via E-Banking Portals. Göteborg: Proceedings of 14th European Conference on Information Systems. p. 8.
