= Predictive modelling =

Form of modelling that uses statistics to predict outcomes

In finance and mathematics, predictive modelling is the use of statistics to predict outcomes. Most often the event one wants to predict is in the future, but predictive modelling can be applied to any type of unknown event, regardless of when it occurred. For example, predictive models are often used to detect crimes and identify suspects, after the crime has taken place.

The output of predictive models can come in multiple forms, such as an estimated probability of a certain event occurring (e.g. Binary regression), or a scalar response variable (e.g. Linear regression). The usage of predictive modelling in business decision making is often referred to as predictive analytics.

Predictive modelling is often contrasted with causal modelling. In the former, one may be entirely satisfied to make use of indicators of, or proxies for, the outcome of interest. In the latter, one seeks to determine true cause-and-effect relationships. This distinction has given rise to a burgeoning literature in the fields of research methods and statistics and to the common statement that "correlation does not imply causation".

Depending on definitional boundaries, predictive modelling is synonymous with, or largely overlapping with, the field of machine learning, as it is more commonly referred to in academic or research and development contexts. This growing field has been made more accessible through increases in computing power and new data architectures that allow for more efficient model training techniques (see Attention Is All You Need).

As the power and complexity of predictive modelling continue to grow, fairness in predictive models has become a growing field of study, particularly given the applications of predictive modelling within areas such as healthcare, insurance, and lending.

== Models ==
Nearly any statistical model can be used for prediction purposes. Broadly speaking, there are two classes of predictive models: parametric and non-parametric. A third class, semi-parametric models, includes features of both. Parametric models make "specific assumptions with regard to one or more of the population parameters that characterize the underlying distribution(s)". Non-parametric models "typically involve fewer assumptions of structure and distributional form [than parametric models] but usually contain strong assumptions about independencies".

== Applications ==
=== Archaeology ===
Predictive modelling in archaeology gets its foundations from Gordon Willey's mid-fifties work in the Virú Valley of Peru. Complete, intensive surveys were performed then covariability between cultural remains and natural features such as slope and vegetation were determined. Development of quantitative methods and a greater availability of applicable data led to growth of the discipline in the 1960s and by the late 1980s, substantial progress had been made by major land managers worldwide.

Generally, predictive modelling in archaeology is establishing statistically valid causal or covariable relationships between natural proxies such as soil types, elevation, slope, vegetation, proximity to water, geology, geomorphology, etc., and the presence of archaeological features. Through analysis of these quantifiable attributes from land that has undergone archaeological survey, sometimes the "archaeological sensitivity" of unsurveyed areas can be anticipated based on the natural proxies in those areas. Large land managers in the United States, such as the Bureau of Land Management (BLM), the Department of Defense (DOD), and numerous highway and parks agencies, have successfully employed this strategy. By using predictive modelling in their cultural resource management plans, they are capable of making more informed decisions when planning for activities that have the potential to require ground disturbance and subsequently affect archaeological sites.

=== Customer relationship management ===
Predictive modelling is used extensively in analytical customer relationship management and data mining to produce customer-level models that describe the likelihood that a customer will take a particular action. The actions are usually sales, marketing and customer retention related.

For example, a large consumer organization such as a mobile telecommunications operator will have a set of predictive models for product cross-sell, product deep-sell (or upselling) and churn. It is also now more common for such an organization to have a model of savability using an uplift model. This predicts the likelihood that a customer can be saved at the end of a contract period (the change in churn probability) as opposed to the standard churn prediction model.

=== Insurance ===
There are a number of applications of predictive modelling within the insurance industry, mainly due to the forward-looking nature of insurance contracts. In fact, a key principle of Property & Casualty insurance ratemaking is that rates must be based on future expectation of costs, and not recouping historical losses, making predictive modelling critical to this function.

Predictive modelling is utilised in vehicle insurance to assign risk of incidents to policy holders from information obtained from policy holders. This is extensively employed in usage-based insurance solutions where predictive models utilise telemetry-based data to build a model of predictive risk for claim likelihood. Black-box auto insurance predictive models utilise GPS or accelerometer sensor input only. Some models include a wide range of predictive input beyond basic telemetry including advanced driving behaviour, independent crash records, road history, and user profiles to provide improved risk models.

=== Health care ===
In 2009 Parkland Health & Hospital System began analyzing electronic medical records in order to use predictive modeling to help identify patients at high risk of readmission. Initially, the hospital focused on patients with congestive heart failure, but the program has expanded to include patients with diabetes, acute myocardial infarction, and pneumonia.

In 2018, Banerjee et al. proposed a deep learning model for estimating short-term life expectancy (>3 months) of the patients by analyzing free-text clinical notes in the electronic medical record, while maintaining the temporal visit sequence. The model was trained on a large dataset (10,293 patients) and validated on a separated dataset (1818 patients). It achieved an area under the ROC (Receiver Operating Characteristic) curve of 0.89. To provide explain-ability, they developed an interactive graphical tool that may improve physician understanding of the basis for the model's predictions. The high accuracy and explain-ability of the PPES-Met model may enable the model to be used as a decision support tool to personalize metastatic cancer treatment and provide valuable assistance to physicians.

The first clinical prediction model reporting guidelines were published in 2015 (Transparent reporting of a multivariable prediction model for individual prognosis or diagnosis (TRIPOD)), and have since been updated. The TRIPOD statement was updated in 2024 to the TRIPOD+AI statement that includes items for machine learning and artificial intelligence methods. The TRIPOD+AI statement superscedes the TRIPOD statement.

Clinical prediction models have also been shown to be developed on unreliable data that is suspected to be synthetic or fabricated without data provenance and were subsequently used in clinical practice.

=== Algorithmic trading ===
Predictive modeling in trading is a modeling process wherein the probability of an outcome is predicted using a set of predictor variables. Predictive models can be built for different assets like stocks, futures, currencies, commodities etc. Predictive modeling is still extensively used by trading firms to devise strategies and trade. It utilizes mathematically advanced software to evaluate indicators on price, volume, open interest and other historical data, to discover repeatable patterns.

=== Lead tracking systems ===
Predictive modelling gives lead generators a head start by forecasting data-driven outcomes for each potential campaign. This method saves time and exposes potential blind spots to help client make smarter decisions.

=== Agricultural cooperatives ===
Predictive modelling has been used to forecast the sustainability of U.S. farmer cooperatives, focusing on the impact of membership heterogeneity and its importance in predicting future aggregate levels of sustainability in the agricultural cooperative macroenvironment.

== Fairness in predictive modelling ==
When predictive modelling is used for automated decision making processes, care must be taken to ensure that predictions are not biased in a discriminatory manner (see Fairness (machine learning)). Even if the model does not directly use sensitive information in the generation of predictions, it can produce outcomes that systematically discriminate against particular groups.

== Fundamental limitations of predictive models ==
History cannot always accurately predict the future. Using relations derived from historical data to predict the future implicitly assumes there are certain lasting conditions or constants in a complex system. This almost always leads to some imprecision when the system involves people.

Unknown unknowns are an issue. In all data collection, the collector first defines the set of variables for which data is collected. However, no matter how extensive the collector considers his/her selection of the variables, there is always the possibility of new variables that have not been considered or even defined, yet are critical to the outcome.

Models can be defeated adversarially. After a model becomes an accepted standard of measurement, knowledge of the impact of individual explanatory variables on target variable predictions allows for the model to be taken advantage of until the model is retrained. This phenomenon contributed to the 2008 financial crisis, wherein CDO dealers actively fulfilled the rating agencies' input to reach an AAA or super-AAA on the CDO they were issuing.

== See also ==
- Calibration (statistics)
- Prediction interval
- Predictive analytics
- Predictive inference
- Statistical learning theory
- Statistical model
