= Value-added selling =

Value added selling is one of several sales techniques that relies on building on the inherent value of a product or service. By its nature the value add technique is a more flexible and customized selling approach that requires input from a defined range of average customers. This customer feedback helps sales and marketing professionals to outline value propositions that are likely to benefit the largest number of customers.

The value add may not be initially apparent in the sales overview and is often tied to upselling or vertical selling within a specific market segment. The utility of the product or service, ease of integration into the customers' business operations or time saving benefits are just a few areas that may be capitalized on when focusing on value add.

== Examples ==
- Food sold in a plastic box or a glass that can be used after its content is consumed.
- Camera sold with converter to old type of photographic lens.
- An automotive company implemented an after-sales support program that included extended warranties and complimentary maintenance services. This initiative aimed to address customer concerns regarding long-term vehicle reliability and contributed to a reported 25% increase in customer retention.
- A gaming console manufacturer established an online user community designed for sharing experiences, tips, and custom content. This community-building effort enhanced the overall user experience and was associated with a 15% rise in subscriptions to the company’s online services.
