= Association rule learning =

Method for discovering interesting relations between variables in databases

Association rule learning is a rule-based machine learning method for discovering interesting relations between variables in large databases. It is intended to identify strong rules discovered in databases using some measures of interestingness. In any given transaction with a variety of items, association rules are meant to discover the rules that determine how or why certain items are connected.

Based on the concept of strong rules, Rakesh Agrawal, Tomasz Imieliński and Arun Swami introduced association rules for discovering regularities between products in large-scale transaction data recorded by point-of-sale (POS) systems in supermarkets. For example, the rule $\{\mathrm{onions, potatoes}\} \Rightarrow \{\mathrm{burger}\}$ found in the sales data of a supermarket would indicate that if a customer buys onions and potatoes together, they are likely to also buy hamburger meat. Such information can be used as the basis for decisions about marketing activities such as, e.g., promotional pricing or product placements.

In addition to the above example from market basket analysis, association rules are employed today in many application areas including Web usage mining, intrusion detection, continuous production, and bioinformatics. In contrast with sequence mining, association rule learning typically does not consider the order of items either within a transaction or across transactions.

The association rule algorithm itself consists of various parameters that can make it difficult for those without some expertise in data mining to execute, with many rules that are arduous to understand.

== Definition ==
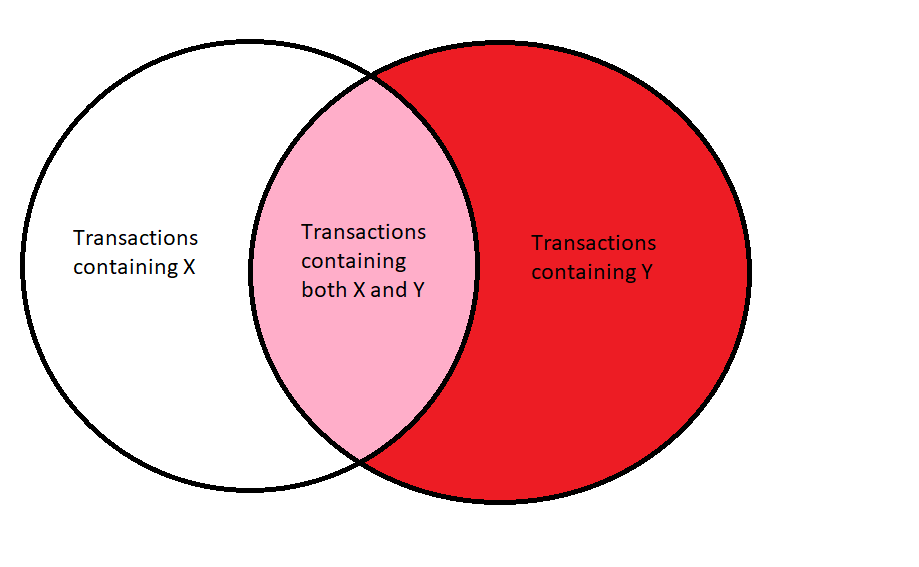
A Venn Diagram to show the associations between itemsets X and Y of a dataset. All transactions that contain item X are located in the white, left portion of the circle, while those containing Y are colored red and on the right. Any transaction containing both X and Y are located in the middle and are colored pink. Multiple concepts can be used to depict information from this graph. For example, if one takes all of the transactions in the pink section and divided them by the total amount of transactions (transactions containing X (white) + transactions containing Y(red)), the output would be known as the support. An instance of getting the result of a method known as the confidence, one can take all of the transactions in the middle (pink) and divide them by all transactions that contain Y (red and pink). In this case, Y is the antecedent and X is the consequent.

Following the original definition by Agrawal, Imieliński, Swami the problem of association rule mining is defined as:

Let $I=\{i_1, i_2,\ldots,i_n\}$ be a set of n binary attributes called items.

Let $D = \{t_1, t_2, \ldots, t_m\}$ be a set of transactions called the database.

Each transaction in D has a unique transaction ID and contains a subset of the items in I.

A rule is defined as an implication of the form:

$X \Rightarrow Y$, where $X, Y \subseteq I$.

In Agrawal, Imieliński, Swami a rule is defined only between a set and a single item, $X \Rightarrow i_j$ for $i_j \in I$.

Every rule is composed by two different sets of items, also known as itemsets, X and Y, where X is called antecedent or left-hand-side (LHS) and Y consequent or right-hand-side (RHS). The antecedent is that item that can be found in the data while the consequent is the item found when combined with the antecedent. The statement $X \Rightarrow Y$ is often read as if X then Y, where the antecedent (X ) is the if and the consequent (Y) is the then. This simply implies that, in theory, whenever X occurs in a dataset, then Y will as well.

== Process ==
Association rules are made by searching data for frequent if-then patterns and by using a certain criterion under Support and Confidence to define what the most important relationships are. Support is the evidence of how frequent an item appears in the data given, as Confidence is defined by how many times the if-then statements are found true. However, there is a third criteria that can be used, it is called Lift and it can be used to compare the expected Confidence and the actual Confidence. Lift will show how many times the if-then statement is expected to be found to be true.

Association rules are made to calculate from itemsets, which are created by two or more items. If the rules were built from the analyzing from all the possible itemsets from the data then there would be so many rules that they wouldn't have any meaning. That is why Association rules are typically made from rules that are well represented by the data.

There are many different data mining techniques you could use to find certain analytics and results, for example, there is Classification analysis, Clustering analysis, and Regression analysis. What technique you should use depends on what you are looking for with your data. Association rules are primarily used to find analytics and a prediction of customer behavior. For Classification analysis, it would most likely be used to question, make decisions, and predict behavior. Clustering analysis is primarily used when there are no assumptions made about the likely relationships within the data. Regression analysis Is used when you want to predict the value of a continuous dependent from a number of independent variables.

Benefits

There are many benefits of using Association rules like finding the pattern that helps understand the correlations and co-occurrences between data sets. A very good real-world example that uses Association rules would be medicine. Medicine uses Association rules to help diagnose patients. When diagnosing patients there are many variables to consider as many diseases will share similar symptoms. With the use of the Association rules, doctors can determine the conditional probability of an illness by comparing symptom relationships from past cases.

Downsides

However, Association rules also lead to many different downsides such as finding the appropriate parameter and threshold settings for the mining algorithm. But there is also the downside of having a large number of discovered rules. The reason is that this does not guarantee that the rules will be found relevant, but it could also cause the algorithm to have low performance. Sometimes the implemented algorithms will contain too many variables and parameters. For someone that doesn't have a good concept of data mining, this might cause them to have trouble understanding it.

Thresholds

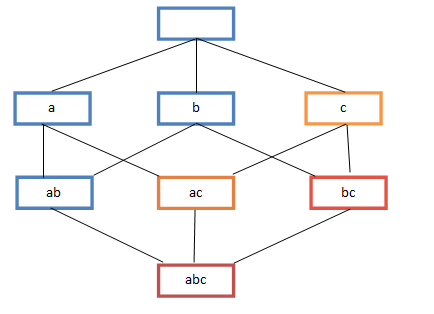
Frequent itemset lattice, where the color of the box indicates how many transactions contain the combination of items. Note that lower levels of the lattice can contain at most the minimum number of their parents' items; e.g. {ac} can have only at most $\min(a,c)$ items. This is called the downward-closure property.

When using Association rules, you are most likely to only use Support and Confidence. However, this means you have to satisfy a user-specified minimum support and a user-specified minimum confidence at the same time. Usually, the Association rule generation is split into two different steps that needs to be applied:

1. A minimum Support threshold to find all the frequent itemsets that are in the database.
2. A minimum Confidence threshold to the frequent itemsets found to create rules.

Table 1. Example of Threshold for Support and Confidence.
Items	Support	Confidence	Items	Support	Confidence
Item A	30%	50%	Item C	45%	55%
Item B	15%	25%	Item A	30%	50%
Item C	45%	55%	Item D	35%	40%
Item D	35%	40%	Item B	15%	25%

The Support Threshold is 30%, Confidence Threshold is 50%

The Table on the left is the original unorganized data and the table on the right is organized by the thresholds. In this case Item C is better than the thresholds for both Support and Confidence which is why it is first. Item A is second because its threshold values are spot on. Item D has met the threshold for Support but not Confidence. Item B has not met the threshold for either Support or Confidence and that is why it is last.

To find all the frequent itemsets in a database is not an easy task since it involves going through all the data to find all possible item combinations from all possible itemsets. The set of possible itemsets is the power set over I and has size $2^n-1$ , of course this means to exclude the empty set which is not considered to be a valid itemset. However, the size of the power set will grow exponentially in the number of item n that is within the power set I. An efficient search is possible by using the downward-closure property of support (also called anti-monotonicity). This would guarantee that a frequent itemset and all its subsets are also frequent and thus will have no infrequent itemsets as a subset of a frequent itemset. Exploiting this property, efficient algorithms (e.g., Apriori and Eclat) can find all frequent itemsets.

== Useful Concepts ==
Table 2. Example database with 5 transactions and 7 items
transaction ID	milk	bread	butter	beer	diapers	eggs	fruit
1	1	1	0	0	0	0	1
2	0	0	1	0	0	1	1
3	0	0	0	1	1	0	0
4	1	1	1	0	0	1	1
5	0	1	0	0	0	0	0

To illustrate the concepts, we use a small example from the supermarket domain. Table 2 shows a small database containing the items where, in each entry, the value 1 means the presence of the item in the corresponding transaction, and the value 0 represents the absence of an item in that transaction. The set of items is $I= \{\mathrm{milk, bread, butter, beer, diapers, eggs, fruit}\}$.

An example rule for the supermarket could be $\{\mathrm{butter, bread}\} \Rightarrow \{\mathrm{milk}\}$ meaning that if butter and bread are bought, customers also buy milk.

In order to select interesting rules from the set of all possible rules, constraints on various measures of significance and interest are used. The best-known constraints are minimum thresholds on support and confidence.

Let $X, Y$ be itemsets, $X \Rightarrow Y$ an association rule and T a set of transactions of a given database.

Note: this example is extremely small. In practical applications, a rule needs a support of several hundred transactions before it can be considered statistically significant, and datasets often contain thousands or millions of transactions.

=== Support ===
Support is an indication of how frequently the itemset appears in the dataset:

$$\text{support}(A) = P(A)= \frac{(\text{number of transactions containing }A)}\text{ (total number of transactions)}$$

The support of a rule is defined as:

$$\text{support}(A \Rightarrow B) = P(A \cup B) = \frac{(\text{number of transactions containing }A\text{ and }B)}\text{ (total number of transactions)}$$

where A and B are separate item sets that occur at the same time in a transaction.

Using Table 2 as an example, the itemset $X=\{\mathrm{beer, diapers}\}$ has a support of 1/5=0.2 since it occurs in 20% of all transactions (1 out of 5 transactions). The argument of support of X is a set of preconditions, and thus becomes more restrictive as it grows (instead of more inclusive).

Furthermore, the itemset $Y=\{\mathrm{milk, bread, butter}\}$ has a support of 1/5=0.2 as it appears in 20% of all transactions as well.

When using antecedents and consequents, it allows a data miner to determine the support of multiple items being bought together in comparison to the whole data set. For example, Table 2 shows that if milk is bought, then bread is bought has a support of 0.4 or 40%. This because in 2 out 5 of the transactions, milk as well as bread are bought. In smaller data sets like this example, it is harder to see a strong correlation when there are few samples, but when the data set grows larger, support can be used to find correlation between two or more products in the supermarket example.

Minimum support thresholds are useful for determining which itemsets are preferred or interesting.

If we set the support threshold to ≥0.4 in Table 3, then the $\{\mathrm{milk}\} \Rightarrow \{\mathrm{eggs}\}$ would be removed since it did not meet the minimum threshold of 0.4. Minimum threshold is used to remove samples where there is not a strong enough support or confidence to deem the sample as important or interesting in the dataset.

Another way of finding interesting samples is to find the value of (support)×(confidence); this allows a data miner to see the samples where support and confidence are high enough to be highlighted in the dataset and prompt a closer look at the sample to find more information on the connection between the items.

Support can be beneficial for finding the connection between products in comparison to the whole dataset, whereas confidence looks at the connection between one or more items and another item. Below is a table that shows the comparison and contrast between support and support × confidence, using the information from Table 4 to derive the confidence values.

Table 3. Example of Support, and support × confidence
if Antecedent then Consequent	support	support X confidence
if buy milk, then buy bread	2/5= 0.4	0.4×1.0= 0.4
if buy milk, then buy eggs	1/5= 0.2	0.2×0.5= 0.1
if buy bread, then buy fruit	2/5= 0.4	0.4×0.66= 0.264
if buy fruit, then buy eggs	2/5= 0.4	0.4×0.66= 0.264
if buy milk and bread, then buy fruit	2/5= 0.4	0.4×1.0= 0.4

The support of X with respect to T is defined as the proportion of transactions in the dataset which contains the itemset X. Denoting a transaction by $(i,t)$ where i is the unique identifier of the transaction and t is its itemset, the support may be written as:

$$\mathrm{support\,of\,X} = \frac{|\{(i,t) \in T : X \subseteq t \}|}{|T|}$$

This notation can be used when defining more complicated datasets where the items and itemsets may not be as easy as our supermarket example above. Other examples of where support can be used is in finding groups of genetic mutations that work collectively to cause a disease, investigating the number of subscribers that respond to upgrade offers, and discovering which products in a drug store are never bought together.

=== Confidence ===
Confidence is the percentage of all transactions satisfying X that also satisfy Y.

With respect to T, the confidence value of an association rule, often denoted as $X \Rightarrow Y$, is the ratio of transactions containing both X and Y to the total amount of X values present, where X is the antecedent and Y is the consequent.

Confidence can also be interpreted as an estimate of the conditional probability $P(E_Y | E_X)$, the probability of finding the RHS of the rule in transactions under the condition that these transactions also contain the LHS.

It is commonly depicted as:

$$\mathrm{conf}(X \Rightarrow Y) = P(Y | X) = \frac{\mathrm{supp}(X \cup Y)}{ \mathrm{supp}(X) }=\frac{\text{number of transactions containing }X\text{ and }Y}{\text{number of transactions containing }X}$$

The equation illustrates that confidence can be computed by calculating the co-occurrence of transactions X and Y within the dataset in ratio to transactions containing only X. This means that the number of transactions in both X and Y is divided by those just in X .

For example, Table 2 shows the rule $\{\mathrm{butter, bread}\} \Rightarrow \{\mathrm{milk}\}$ which has a confidence of $\frac{1/5}{1/5}=\frac{0.2}{0.2}=1.0$ in the dataset, which denotes that every time a customer buys butter and bread, they also buy milk. This particular example demonstrates the rule being correct 100% of the time for transactions containing both butter and bread. The rule $\{\mathrm{fruit}\} \Rightarrow \{\mathrm{eggs}\}$, however, has a confidence of $\frac{2/5}{3/5}=\frac{0.4}{0.6}=0.67$. This suggests that eggs are bought 67% of the times that fruit is brought. Within this particular dataset, fruit is purchased a total of 3 times, with two of those times consisting of egg purchases.

For larger datasets, a minimum threshold, or a percentage cutoff, for the confidence can be useful for determining item relationships. When applying this method to some of the data in Table 2, information that does not meet the requirements are removed. Table 4 shows association rule examples where the minimum threshold for confidence is 0.5 (50%). Any data that does not have a confidence of at least 0.5 is omitted. Generating thresholds allow for the association between items to become stronger as the data is further researched by emphasizing those that co-occur the most. The table uses the confidence information from Table 3 to implement the Support × Confidence column, where the relationship between items via their both confidence and support, instead of just one concept, is highlighted. Ranking the rules by Support × Confidence multiples the confidence of a particular rule to its support and is often implemented for a more in-depth understanding of the relationship between the items.

Table 4. Example of Confidence and Support × Confidence
if Antecedent then Consequent	Confidence	Support × Confidence
if buy milk, then buy bread	2/2 = 1.0	0.4×1.0= 0.4
if buy milk, then buy eggs	1/2 = 0.5	0.2×0.5= 0.1
if buy bread, then buy fruit	2/3 ≈ 0.66	0.4×0.66= 0.264
if buy fruit, then buy eggs	2/3 ≈ 0.66	0.4×0.66= 0.264
if buy milk and bread, then buy fruit	2/2 = 1.0	0.4×1.0= 0.4

Overall, using confidence in association rule mining is great way to bring awareness to data relations. Its greatest benefit is highlighting the relationship between particular items to one another within the set, as it compares co-occurrences of items to the total occurrence of the antecedent in the specific rule. However, confidence is not the optimal method for every concept in association rule mining. The disadvantage of using it is that it does not offer multiple difference outlooks on the associations. Unlike support, for instance, confidence does not provide the perspective of relationships between certain items in comparison to the entire dataset, so while milk and bread, for example, may occur 100% of the time for confidence, it only has a support of 0.4 (40%). This is why it is important to look at other viewpoints, such as Support × Confidence, instead of solely relying on one concept incessantly to define the relationships.

=== Lift ===
The lift of a rule is defined as:

$\mathrm{lift}(X\Rightarrow Y) = \frac{ \mathrm{supp}(X \cup Y)}{ \mathrm{supp}(X) \times \mathrm{supp}(Y) }$

or the ratio of the observed support to that expected if X and Y were independent.

For example, the rule $\{\mathrm{milk, bread}\} \Rightarrow \{\mathrm{butter}\}$ has a lift of $\frac{0.2}{0.4 \times 0.4} = 1.25$.

If the rule had a lift of 1, it would imply that the probability of occurrence of the antecedent and that of the consequent are independent of each other. When two events are independent of each other, no rule can be drawn involving those two events.

If the lift is > 1, that lets us know the degree to which those two occurrences are dependent on one another, and makes those rules potentially useful for predicting the consequent in future data sets.

If the lift is < 1, that lets us know the items are substitute to each other. This means that presence of one item has negative effect on presence of other item and vice versa.

The value of lift is that it considers both the support of the rule and the overall data set.

=== Conviction ===
The conviction of a rule is defined as $\mathrm{conv}(X\Rightarrow Y) =\frac{ 1 - \mathrm{supp}(Y) }{ 1 - \mathrm{conf}(X\Rightarrow Y)}$.

For example, the rule $\{\mathrm{milk, bread}\} \Rightarrow \{\mathrm{butter}\}$ has a conviction of $\frac{1 - 0.4}{1 - 0.5} = 1.2$, and can be interpreted as the ratio of the expected frequency that X occurs without Y (that is to say, the frequency that the rule makes an incorrect prediction) if X and Y were independent divided by the observed frequency of incorrect predictions. In this example, the conviction value of 1.2 shows that the rule $\{\mathrm{milk, bread}\} \Rightarrow \{\mathrm{butter}\}$ would be incorrect 20% more often (1.2 times as often) if the association between X and Y was purely random chance.

=== Alternative measures of interestingness ===
In addition to confidence, other measures of interestingness for rules have been proposed. Some popular measures are:

- All-confidence
- Collective strength
- Leverage

Several more measures are presented and compared by Tan et al. and by Hahsler. Looking for techniques that can model what the user has known (and using these models as interestingness measures) is currently an active research trend under the name of "Subjective Interestingness."

== History ==
The concept of association rules was popularized particularly due to the 1993 article of Agrawal et al., which has acquired more than 23,790 citations according to Google Scholar, as of April 2021, and is thus one of the most cited papers in the Data Mining field. However, what is now called "association rules" is introduced already in the 1966 paper on GUHA, a general data mining method developed by Petr Hájek et al.

An early (circa 1989) use of minimum support and confidence to find all association rules is the Feature Based Modeling framework, which found all rules with $\mathrm{supp}(X)$ and $\mathrm{conf}(X \Rightarrow Y)$ greater than user defined constraints.

== Statistically sound associations ==
One limitation of the standard approach to discovering associations is that by searching massive numbers of possible associations to look for collections of items that appear to be associated, there is a large risk of finding many spurious associations. These are collections of items that co-occur with unexpected frequency in the data, but only do so by chance. For example, suppose we are considering a collection of 10,000 items and looking for rules containing two items in the left-hand-side and 1 item in the right-hand-side. There are approximately 1,000,000,000,000 such rules. If we apply a statistical test for independence with a significance level of 0.05 it means there is only a 5% chance of accepting a rule if there is no association. If we assume there are no associations, we should nonetheless expect to find 50,000,000,000 rules. Statistically sound association discovery controls this risk, in most cases reducing the risk of finding any spurious associations to a user-specified significance level.

== Algorithms ==
Many algorithms for generating association rules have been proposed.

Some well-known algorithms are Apriori, Eclat algorithm and FP-Growth, but they only do half the job, since they are algorithms for mining frequent itemsets. Another step needs to be done after to generate rules from frequent itemsets found in a database.

=== Apriori algorithm ===
Apriori is given by R. Agrawal and R. Srikant in 1994 for frequent item set mining and association rule learning. It proceeds by identifying the frequent individual items in the database and extending them to larger and larger item sets as long as those item sets appear sufficiently often. The name of the algorithm is Apriori because it uses prior knowledge of frequent itemset properties.

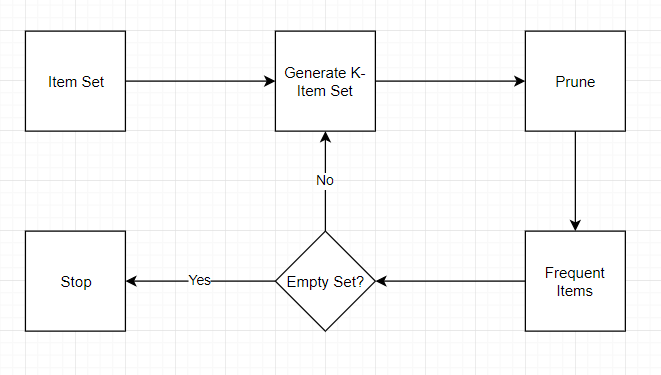
The control flow diagram for the Apriori algorithm

Overview: Apriori uses a "bottom up" approach, where frequent subsets are extended one item at a time (a step known as candidate generation), and groups of candidates are tested against the data. The algorithm terminates when no further successful extensions are found. Apriori uses breadth-first search and a Hash tree structure to count candidate item sets efficiently. It generates candidate item sets of length from item sets of length . Then it prunes the candidates which have an infrequent sub pattern. According to the downward closure lemma, the candidate set contains all frequent -length item sets. After that, it scans the transaction database to determine frequent item sets among the candidates.

Example: Assume that each row is a cancer sample with a certain combination of mutations labeled by a character in the alphabet. For example a row could have {a, c} which means it is affected by mutation 'a' and mutation 'c'.

Input Set
{a, b}	{c, d}	{a, d}	{a, e}	{b, d}	{a, b, d}	{a, c, d}	{a, b, c, d}

Now we will generate the frequent item set by counting the number of occurrences of each character. This is also known as finding the support values. Then we will prune the item set by picking a minimum support threshold. For this pass of the algorithm we will pick 3.

Support Values
a	b	c	d
6	4	3	6

Since all support values are three or above there is no pruning. The frequent item set is {a}, {b}, {c}, and {d}. After this we will repeat the process by counting pairs of mutations in the input set.

Support Values
{a, b}	{a, c}	{a, d}	{b, c}	{b, d}	{c, d}
3	2	4	1	3	3

Now we will make our minimum support value 4 so only {a, d} will remain after pruning. Now we will use the frequent item set to make combinations of triplets. We will then repeat the process by counting occurrences of triplets of mutations in the input set.

Support Values
{a, c, d}
2

Since we only have one item the next set of combinations of quadruplets is empty so the algorithm will stop.

Advantages and Limitations:

Apriori has some limitations. Candidate generation can result in large candidate sets. For example a 10^4 frequent 1-itemset will generate a 10^7 candidate 2-itemset. The algorithm also needs to frequently scan the database, to be specific n+1 scans where n is the length of the longest pattern. Apriori is slower than the Eclat algorithm. However, Apriori performs well compared to Eclat when the dataset is large. This is because in the Eclat algorithm if the dataset is too large the tid-lists become too large for memory. FP-growth outperforms the Apriori and Eclat. This is due to the FP-growth algorithm not having candidate generation or test, using a compact data structure, and only having one database scan.

=== Eclat algorithm ===
Eclat (alt. ECLAT, stands for Equivalence Class Transformation) is a backtracking algorithm, which traverses the frequent itemset lattice graph in a depth-first search (DFS) fashion. Whereas the breadth-first search (BFS) traversal used in the Apriori algorithm will end up checking every subset of an itemset before checking it, DFS traversal checks larger itemsets and can save on checking the support of some of its subsets by virtue of the downward-closer property. Furthermore it will almost certainly use less memory as DFS has a lower space complexity than BFS.

To illustrate this, let there be a frequent itemset {a, b, c}. a DFS may check the nodes in the frequent itemset lattice in the following order: {a} → {a, b} → {a, b, c}, at which point it is known that {b}, {c}, {a, c}, {b, c} all satisfy the support constraint by the downward-closure property. BFS would explore each subset of {a, b, c} before finally checking it. As the size of an itemset increases, the number of its subsets undergoes combinatorial explosion.

It is suitable for both sequential as well as parallel execution with locality-enhancing properties.

=== FP-growth algorithm ===
FP stands for frequent pattern.

In the first pass, the algorithm counts the occurrences of items (attribute-value pairs) in the dataset of transactions, and stores these counts in a 'header table'. In the second pass, it builds the FP-tree structure by inserting transactions into a trie.

Items in each transaction have to be sorted by descending order of their frequency in the dataset before being inserted so that the tree can be processed quickly. Items in each transaction that do not meet the minimum support requirement are discarded. If many transactions share most frequent items, the FP-tree provides high compression close to tree root.

Recursive processing of this compressed version of the main dataset grows frequent item sets directly, instead of generating candidate items and testing them against the entire database (as in the apriori algorithm).

Growth begins from the bottom of the header table i.e. the item with the smallest support by finding all sorted transactions that end in that item. Call this item $I$.

A new conditional tree is created which is the original FP-tree projected onto $I$. The supports of all nodes in the projected tree are re-counted with each node getting the sum of its children counts. Nodes (and hence subtrees) that do not meet the minimum support are pruned. Recursive growth ends when no individual items conditional on $I$ meet the minimum support threshold. The resulting paths from root to $I$ will be frequent itemsets. After this step, processing continues with the next least-supported header item of the original FP-tree.

Once the recursive process has completed, all frequent item sets will have been found, and association rule creation begins.

=== Others ===
==== ASSOC ====
The ASSOC procedure is a GUHA method which mines for generalized association rules using fast bitstrings operations. The association rules mined by this method are more general than those output by apriori, for example "items" can be connected both with conjunction and disjunctions and the relation between antecedent and consequent of the rule is not restricted to setting minimum support and confidence as in apriori: an arbitrary combination of supported interest measures can be used.

==== OPUS search ====
OPUS is an efficient algorithm for rule discovery that, in contrast to most alternatives, does not require either monotone or anti-monotone constraints such as minimum support. Initially used to find rules for a fixed consequent it has subsequently been extended to find rules with any item as a consequent. OPUS search is the core technology in the popular Magnum Opus association discovery system.

== Lore ==
A famous story about association rule mining is the "beer and diaper" story. A purported survey of behavior of supermarket shoppers discovered that customers (presumably young men) who buy diapers tend also to buy beer. This anecdote became popular as an example of how unexpected association rules might be found from everyday data. There are varying opinions as to how much of the story is true. Daniel Powers says:

In 1992, Thomas Blischok, manager of a retail consulting group at Teradata, and his staff prepared an analysis of 1.2 million market baskets from about 25 Osco Drug stores. Database queries were developed to identify affinities. The analysis "did discover that between 5:00 and 7:00 p.m. that consumers bought beer and diapers". Osco managers did NOT exploit the beer and diapers relationship by moving the products closer together on the shelves.

== Other types of association rule mining ==
Multi-Relation Association Rules (MRAR): These are association rules where each item may have several relations. These relations indicate indirect relationships between the entities. Consider the following MRAR where the first item consists of three relations live in, nearby and humid: "Those who live in a place which is nearby a city with humid climate type and also are younger than 20 $\implies$ their health condition is good". Such association rules can be extracted from RDBMS data or semantic web data.

Contrast set learning is a form of associative learning. Contrast set learners use rules that differ meaningfully in their distribution across subsets.

Weighted class learning is another form of associative learning where weights may be assigned to classes to give focus to a particular issue of concern for the consumer of the data mining results.

High-order pattern discovery facilitates the capture of high-order (polythetic) patterns or event associations that are intrinsic to complex real-world data.

K-optimal pattern discovery provides an alternative to the standard approach to association rule learning which requires that each pattern appear frequently in the data.

Approximate Frequent Itemset mining is a relaxed version of Frequent Itemset mining that allows some of the items in some of the rows to be 0.

Generalized Association Rules hierarchical taxonomy (concept hierarchy)

Quantitative Association Rules categorical and quantitative data

Interval Data Association Rules e.g. partition the age into 5-year-increment ranged

Sequential pattern mining discovers subsequences that are common to more than minsup (minimum support threshold) sequences in a sequence database, where minsup is set by the user. A sequence is an ordered list of transactions.

Subspace Clustering, a specific type of clustering high-dimensional data, is in many variants also based on the downward-closure property for specific clustering models.

Warmr, shipped as part of the ACE data mining suite, allows association rule learning for first order relational rules.

== See also ==
- Sequence mining
- Production system (computer science)
- Learning classifier system
- Rule-based machine learning
