= Upselling =

Sales technique

Upselling is a sales technique where a seller invites the customer to purchase more expensive items, upgrades, or other add-ons to generate more revenue. While it usually involves marketing more profitable services or products, it can be simply exposing the customer to other options that were perhaps not considered.

It is distinct from cross-selling, in which a seller tries to sell something else. In practice, large businesses usually combine upselling and cross-selling to maximize revenue.

== Upselling vs cross-selling ==
Upselling is the practice in which a business tries to motivate customers to purchase a higher-end product, an upgrade, or an additional item in order to make a more profitable sale. For instance, a salesperson may influence a customer into purchasing the newest version of an item, rather than the less-expensive current model, by pointing out its additional features. A similar marketing technique is cross-selling, where the salesperson suggests the purchase of additional products for sale. For example, he might say "Would you like some ice cream to go with that cake?"

== Techniques ==
Upselling techniques work by satisfying the needs of the customer completely- or exceeding them.

Many companies teach their employees to upsell products and services and offer incentives and bonuses to the most successful personnel.

Giving a customer a time bound offer. Tell them why availing it in this particular period could be beneficial. Creating a feeling of urgency is another technique for upselling.

A common technique for successful upsellers is becoming aware of a customer's background, budget and other budgets, allowing the upsellers to understand better what that particular purchaser values, or may come to value.

Another way of upselling is by creating fear over the durability of the purchase, particularly effective on expensive items such as electronics, where an extended warranty can offer peace of mind.

== Overlap with cross-selling and add-on sales ==
It can be hard to divorce all three techniques from each other, given that the difference in each technique is minor. All techniques adopted and effectively practiced within firms are important strategies that are used for increasing revenues among current customers.

An add on sale can simply be defined as a sale of additional goods or services to a buyer. In practice an add-on sale can be seen in a retail scenario; a customer could be buying a suit for a new job after the sizes and colors are to the customers' satisfaction the seller would assume that they would also need shoes, socks, a waistcoat, and a belt to go with. This is a sales technique whereby the seller is trying to encourage or persuade the customer to buy something extra, that may or may not be more expensive, but will still bring up the total amount of the sale. An add on sale is much simpler than a cross-sell or an upsell, because the new item that the seller is exposing the buyer to may cost less than the product they are purchasing; however, the downfall of this technique is that saying "no" to the product being presented is more frequent. Usually two for one deals or "buy one pair and get the second pair half price" deals are the most common ways to transition your sale to that of an add on. From a customer's point of view, adding on can be seen as the seller trying to make the buyer spend more money to bring up the point of the sale. This is why adding on can be difficult, familiarity and relevance of suggestions is important, the seller wants to make sure that the items being shown still match the customers' initial thoughts and ideas. If they do not there is a high chance of losing the sale.

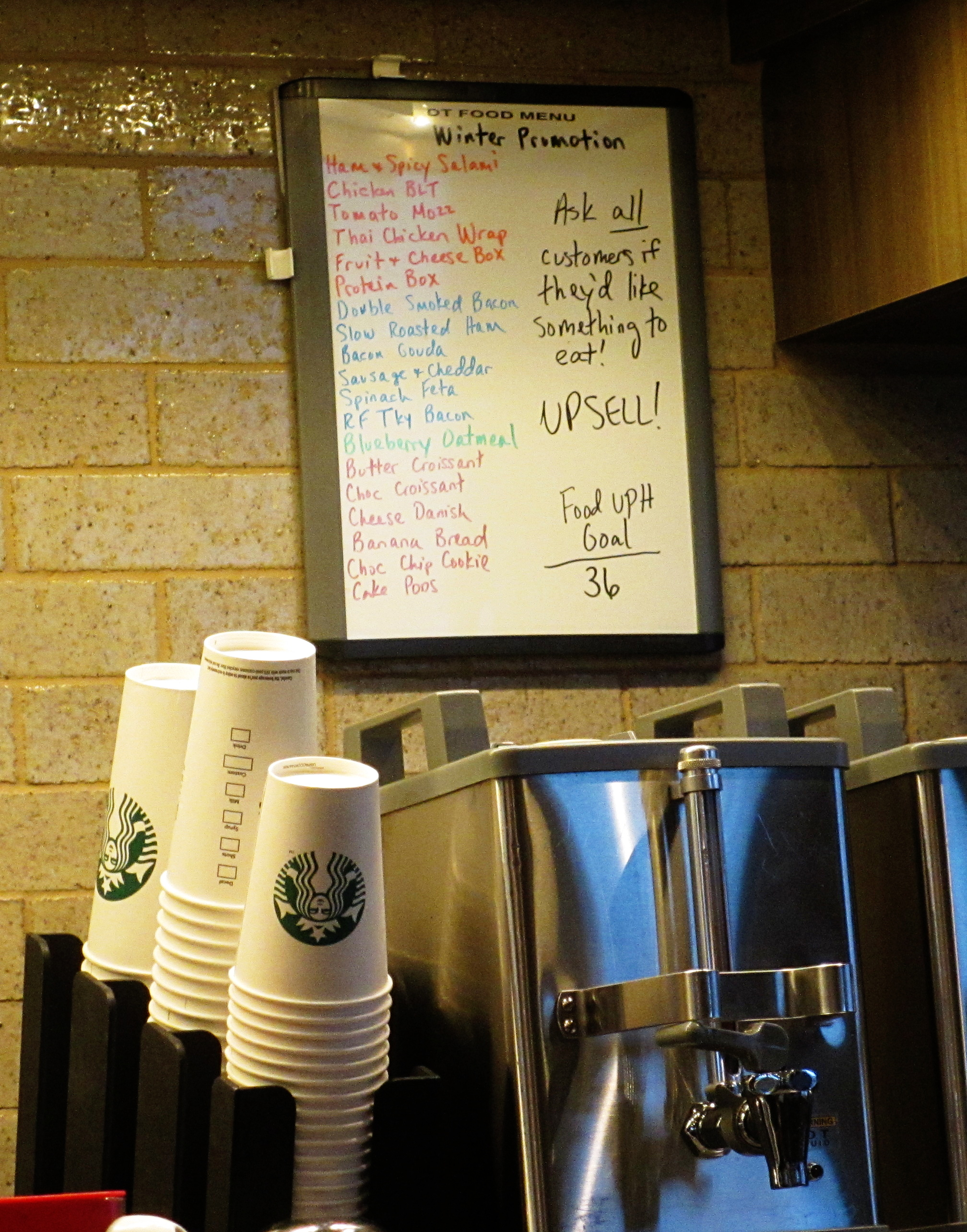
A whiteboard in a branch of Starbucks reminding the staff to "ask all customers if they'd like something to eat" and to "upsell!"

As told in the Journal of Relationship marketing by Kamatura Wagner Cross-selling is a technique used by salespeople to increase the sale by transforming single product buyers to multi-product buyers. Cross-selling is a technique by which the seller will attempt to increase the value of a sale by suggesting an accompanying product. Suggesting related products or services to a customer who is considering buying something. Cross-selling is mostly seen in restaurants or fast food joints, the terms "would you like fries with that?" or "would you like to up-size your order?" are examples of the cross-selling technique. Cross-selling can be most effective when a customer is requiring assistance – where they come to the seller for the purpose of cross-selling. Since the customer has initiated the sale, the mindset would have already been on the firm and its products. This would make it easier for the salesperson to conduct the technique and have it be successful.

An example of an over the phone cross-sell could be that a customer has just switched banks and is getting her account set up with her new bank. After the account is created the bank teller would offer her the cross-sell of signing up to their internet banking app that would allow her to access her account details and pay her accounts online. If cross-selling is properly done, it will be viewed as a service, rather than a sales pitch. A downside to cross-selling can be seen as the same as that of upselling. This main drawback is known as "over-touching" the customer which in simpler terms means, giving too many cross-selling options can result in the customer ignoring the efforts given and can desensitize the customer to future cross-selling offers.

== Ethics ==
When upselling for higher cost items or add ons to customers for goods and services it is advised not to push the sale as it may become unethical. There have been cases where pushing a sale onto customers have caused legal problems, as some retailers may use confusing terms or say half-truths to sell products while the customer is unaware of this happening. In New Zealand, the "Consumer Guarantees Act of 1993" states that if the customer is unhappy with the goods or services rendered, they are entitled to a refund, or the business in question must compensate them for their troubles.

== See also ==
- AIDA (marketing)
- Bait and switch
- Choice architecture
- Contract of sale
- Cross-selling
- Downloadable content
- Freemium
- Good–better–best, a pricing strategy that allows sellers to move buyers up to a higher pricing tier
- List of marketing topics
- Marketing
- Permission marketing
- Promotion (marketing)
- Sales
- Selling technique
- Value-added selling

== Sources ==
- Hoovers. (n.d.). How to Cross-Sell & Up-Sell | Proven Sales Techniques | Hoovers. Retrieved from http://www.hoovers.com/lc/sales-marketing-education/how-to-cross-sell-up-sell.html
- Kearney, J. (2016, February 2). Social Spot WiFi | Turn Your Free Wifi Into a Social Marketing Machine. Retrieved from http://www.socialspotwifi.com/ (this appears unreated and self-promotional)
- Lazazzera, R. (2015, March 4). How to Increase Revenues With Upselling and Cross-selling. Retrieved from https://www.shopify.co.nz/blog/17579484-how-to-increase-revenue-and-improve-the-customer-experience-with-upselling-and-cross-selling
- Low, J. (2015, May 12). Quick Tips for Upselling & Cross-Selling - Business.com. Retrieved from http://www.business.com/ecommerce/quick-tips-for-upselling-and-cross-selling/
- Maximizer. (2015, June 24). 5 Basic Upselling Techniques - Maximizer Blog. Retrieved from http://www.maximizer.com/blog/5-basic-upselling-techniques/ (not an authoritative source nor an recognized expert)
- Bohutinsky, C.H. (1990). The Sell up Potential of Airline Demand. M.S. Thesis, Massachusetts Institute of Technology, Cambridge.
- Lazazzera, R. (2015, March 4). How to Increase Revenue and Improve the Customer Experience with Upselling and Cross-Selling. Retrieved March 26, 2016, from Shopify: https://www.shopify.co.nz/blog/17579484-how-to-increase-revenue-and-improve-the-customer-experience-with-upselling-and-cross-selling (why is this source listed twice, each citation using a different URL for the same article?)
- Levine, L. (1996). "Why cross-selling and Upselling seem to be difficult to implement," Telemarketing . (this does not cite a source and should be removed)
- Low, J. (2015, May 12 ). Super Sales Strategies: Quick Tips for Upselling And Cross-Selling. Retrieved March 24, 2016, from Business.com : http://www.business.com/ecommerce/quick-tips-for-upselling-and-cross-selling/
- Paul R, P., Sheehan, M. J., & John I, C. (1997 ). The Journal of Business and Industrial Marketing .
- Robert C. Blattberg, B. -D. Database Marketing: (Analysing and Managing Customers) . (not a relevant citation)
- Schiffman, S. (2005 ). Upselling Techniques (That really works!) . Adams Media.
