= Special Interest Group on Knowledge Discovery and Data Mining =

Group within the Association for Computing Machinery

SIGKDD, representing the Association for Computing Machinery's (ACM) Special Interest Group (SIG) on Knowledge Discovery and Data Mining, is an organization that hosts an annual conference.

== Conference history ==
The KDD Conference grew from KDD (Knowledge Discovery and Data Mining) workshops at AAAI conferences, which were started by Gregory I. Piatetsky-Shapiro in 1989, 1991, and 1993, and Usama Fayyad in 1994. Conference papers of each proceedings of the SIGKDD International Conference on Knowledge Discovery and Data Mining are published through ACM. KDD is widely considered the most influential forum for knowledge discovery and data mining research.

Year	Conference location
2011	San Diego, United States
2012	Beijing, China
2013	Chicago, IL, United States
2014	New York City, NY, United States
2015	Sydney, Australia
2016	San Francisco, CA, United States
2017	Halifax, Canada
2018	London, England
2019	Anchorage, AK, United States
2020	San Diego, CA, United States
2021	Virtual Conference
2022	Washington, D.C., United States
2023	Long Beach, California, United States
2024	Barcelona, Spain
2025	Toronto, ON, Canada

The KDD conference has been held each year since 1995, and SIGKDD became an official ACM Special Interest Group in 1998. Past conference locations are listed on the KDD conference web site.

The annual ACM SIGKDD conference is recognized as a flagship venue in the field. Based on statistics provided by independent researcher Lexing Xie in her analysis “Visualizing Citation Patterns of Computer Science Conferences“ as part of the research in Computation Media Lab at Australian National University:

- 4489 papers were published at ACM SIGKDD conference over in the years 1994–2015 (inclusive).
- These 4489 papers had received 112570 citations in total across 3033 venues.
- 56% of these 3033 venues are recognized as top 25 venues in the field.

The annual conference of ACM SIGKDD has received the highest rating A* from independent organization Computing Research and Education (a.k.a. CORE).

=== Selection Criteria ===
Like all flagship conferences, SIGKDD imposes a high requirement to present and publish submitted papers. The focus is on innovative research in data mining, knowledge discovery, and large-scale data analytics. Papers emphasizing theoretical foundations are particularly encouraged, as are novel modeling and algorithmic approaches to specific data mining problems in scientific, business, medical, and engineering applications. Visionary papers on new and emerging topics are particularly welcomed. Authors are explicitly discouraged from submitting papers that contain only incremental results or that do not provide significant advances over existing approaches.

In 2014, over 2,600 authors from at least fourteen countries submitted over a thousand papers to the conference. A final 151 papers were accepted for presentation and publication, representing an acceptance rate of 14.6%. This acceptance rate is slightly lower than those of other top computer science conferences, which typically have a rate of 15–25%. The acceptance rate of a conference is only a proxy measure of its quality. For example, in the field of information retrieval, the WSDM conference has a lower acceptance rate than the higher-ranked SIGIR.

== Awards ==
The group recognizes members of the KDD community with its annual Innovation Award and Service Award.

Each year KDD presents a Best Paper Award to recognizes papers presented at the annual SIGKDD conference that advance the fundamental understanding of the field of knowledge discovery in data and data mining. Two research paper awards are granted: Best Research Paper Award Recipients and Best Student Paper Award Recipients.

=== Best Paper Award (Best Research Track Paper) ===
Winning the ACM SIGKDD Best Paper Award (Best Research Track Paper) is widely considered an internationally recognized significant achievement in a researcher's career. Authors compete with established professionals in the field, such as tenured professors, executives, and eminent industry experts from top institutions. It is common to find press articles and news announcements from the awardees’ institutions and professional media to celebrate this achievement.

This award recognizes innovative scholarly articles that advance the fundamental understanding of the field of knowledge discovery in data and data mining. Each year, the award is given to authors of the strongest paper by this criterion, selected by a rigorous process.

==== Selection Process ====
The selection process follows multiple rounds of peer reviews under stringent criteria. The selection committee consists of leading experts who provide insightful and independent analysis on the merits and degree of innovation of the scholarly articles submitted by each author. The reviewers are required to be recognized subject experts who had extensive contributions to the specific subject area addressed by the paper. Reviewers are also required to be completely unaffiliated with the authors.

First, all papers submitted to the ACM SIGKDD conference are reviewed by research track program committee members. Each submitted paper is extensively reviewed by multiple committee members and detailed feedback is given to each author. After review, decisions are made by the committee members to accept or reject the paper based on the paper’s novelty, technical quality, potential impact, clarity, and whether the experimental methods and results are clear, well executed, and repeatable. During the process, committee members also evaluate the merits of each paper based on above factors, and make decision on recommending candidates for Best Paper Award (Best Research Track Paper).

The candidates for Best Paper Award (Best Research Track Paper) are extensively reviewed by conference chairs and the best paper award committee. The final determination of the award is based on the level of advancement made by authors through the paper to the understanding of the field of knowledge discovery and data mining. Authors of a single paper who are judged to have contributed the highest level of advancement to the field are selected as recipients of this award. Anyone who submits a scholarly article to SIGKDD is considered for this award.

==== Previous winners ====
The ACM SIGKDD Best Paper Award (Best Research Track Paper) was given to 49 individuals between 1997 and 2014. Among these individuals, most are distinguished persons and established professionals with celebrated careers, who have made significant contributions to the field.

Year	Name	Position	Affiliation
1997	Foster Provost	Professor	New York University
1997	Tom Fawcett	Principal Data Scientist	Silicon Valley Data Science
1998, 1999	Pedro Domingos	Professor	University of Washington
2000	Anne Rogers	Associate Professor	University of Chicago
2000	Daryl Pregibon	(Former) Head of Statistical Research	AT&T Labs and Bell Labs
2000	Kathleen Fisher	Chair & Professor	Tufts University
2000	Corinna Cortes	Head of Research	Google
2001	Ruben H. Zamar	Professor	University of British Columbia
2001	Raymond T. Ng	Professor	University of British Columbia
2001	Edwin M. Knorr	Tenured Senior Instructor	University of British Columbia
2002	Padhraic Smyth	Professor	University of California, Irvine
2002	Padhraic Smyth	Associate Director	Center for Machine Learning and Intelligent Systems
2002	Darya Chudova	VP of Bioinformatics	Guardant Health
2003	Éva Tardos	Professor & Dean	Cornell University
2003, 2005	Jon Kleinberg	Professor	Cornell University
2003, 2005	Jon Kleinberg	Member	National Academy of Sciences
2003, 2005	Jon Kleinberg	Member	National Academy of Engineering
2003, 2005	Jon Kleinberg	Member	American Academy of Arts and Sciences
2003	David Kempe	Associate Professor	University of Southern California
2004	Raymond J. Mooney	Professor	The University of Texas at Austin
2004	Mikhail (Misha) Bilenko	Head of AI and Research	Yandex
2004	Sugato Basu	Principal Scientist	Google
2004, 2005	Christos Faloutsos	Professor	Carnegie Mellon University
2004, 2005	Christos Faloutsos	Fellow	ACM
2005	Jure Leskovec	Associate Professor	Stanford University
2005	Jure Leskovec	Chief Scientist	Pinterest
2005	Jure Leskovec	Member, Board of Directors	ACM SIGKDD
2006	Thorsten Joachims	Chair & Professor	Cornell University
2006	Thorsten Joachims	Fellow	ACM, AAAI, Humboldt
2007	Srujana Merugu	Principal Data Scientist	Flipkart
2007	Deepak Agarwal	VP of Engineering	LinkedIn
2007	Deepak Agarwal	Fellow	American Statistical Association
2007	Deepak Agarwal	Member, Board of Directors	ACM SIGKDD
2008	Wei Wang	Chair & Professor	University of California, Los Angeles
2008	Wei Wang	Director	Scalable Analytics Institute
2008	Fei Zhou	Professor	University of Florida
2008	Xiang Zhang	Associate Professor	Pennsylvania State University
2009	Yehuda Koren	Staff Research Scientist	Google
2010	Carlos Guestrin	Director of Machine Learning	Apple Inc
2010	Carlos Guestrin	Professor	University of Washington
2010	Carlos Guestrin	Co-founder, CEO	Turi (a.k.a. Dato, GraphLab)
2010	Dafna Shahaf	Assistant Professor	The Hebrew University of Jerusalem
2010	Kai-Wei Chang	Assistant Professor	University of California, Los Angeles
2010	Cho-Jui Hsieh	Assistant Professor	University of California, Davis
2010	Hsiang-Fu Yu	Applied Scientist	Amazon
2010	Chih-Jen Lin	Distinguished Professor	National Taiwan University
2010	Chih-Jen Lin	Fellow	ACM, AAAI, IEEE
2011	Claudia Perlich	Chief Scientist	Dstillery
2011	Claudia Perlich	Adjunct Professor	New York University
2011	Saharon Rosset	Associate Professor	Tel Aviv University
2011	Shachar Kaufman	Senior Data Scientist	Metromile
2012	Thanawin Rakthanmanon	Assistant Professor	Kasetsart University, Thailand
2012	Bilson Campana	Staff Software Engineer	Google
2012	Abdullah Mueen	Assistant Professor	University of New Mexico
2012	Gustavo Batista	Associate Professor	Universidade de São Paulo
2012	Brandon Westover	Director, Critical Care EEG Monitoring Service	Massachusetts General Hospital
2012	Qiang Zhu	Data Science Manager	Airbnb
2012	Jesin Zakaria	Software Engineer	Microsoft
2012	Eamonn Keogh	Professor	University of California, Riverside
2013	Edo Liberty	Principal Scientist	Amazon
2013	Edo Liberty	Group Manager	Amazon AI Algorithms
2014	Alex Smola	Director of Machine Learning and Deep Learning	Amazon
2014	Alex Smola	Professor	Carnegie Mellon University
2014	Sujith Ravi	Staff Research Scientist	Google
2014	Amr Ahmed	Staff Research Scientist	Google
2014	Aaron Li	Founder	Qokka.ai
2014	Aaron Li	(Former) Lead Inference Engineer	Scaled Inference

=== Best Student Paper Award ===
This only difference between "Best Student Paper Award" and "Best Paper Award (Best Research Track Paper)" is the limitation in competition.

All authors participating the conference are considered equally for "Best Paper Award (Best Research Track Paper)", and the award does not limit competition to any particular region, population, or age group.

However, "Best Student Paper Award" is limited to student authors only. "Best Student Paper Award" recognizes papers presented at the annual SIGKDD conference, with a student as a first author, that advance the fundamental understanding of the field of knowledge discovery in data and data mining.

== KDD-Cup ==
SIGKDD sponsors the KDD Cup data mining competition every year in conjunction with the annual conference. It is aimed at members of the industry and academia, particularly students, interested in KDD.

== SIGKDD Explorations ==
SIGKDD has also published a biannual academic journal titled SIGKDD Explorations since June 1999 when Usama Fayyad took on role of Founding Editor-inChief as ACM SIGKDD was formed. Editors in Chief:

- Charu Aggarwal (since 2014)
- Bart Goethals (2010–2013)
- Osmar R. Zaiane (2008–2010)
- Ramakrishnan Srikant (2006–2007)
- Sunita Sarawagi (2003–2006)
- Usama Fayyad (Founding Editor-in-Chief) (1999–2002)

== People ==
The original founding board of directors of SIGKDD in 1998 consist of:

- Won Kim, president, Cyber Database Solutions, SIGKDD Chair
- Rakesh Agrawal, IBM Almaden, SIGKDD Secretary/Treasurer
- Usama Fayyad, Microsoft Research, SIGKDD Director and Editor-in-Chief of SIGKDD Explorations Newsletter
- Gregory Piatetsky-Shapiro, Knowledge Stream Partners, SIGKDD Director
- Daryl Pregibon, AT&T Labs, SIGKDD Director
- Padhraic Smyth, U. of California Irvine, SIGKDD Director

Current chair:

- Bing Liu (2013–)

Former Chairpersons:

- Usama Fayyad (2009–2013)
- Gregory Piatetsky-Shapiro (2005–2009)
- Won Kim (1998–2005)

Former Executive Committee (2009–2013)

- Johannes Gehrke
- Robert Grossman
- David D. Jensen
- Raghu Ramakrishnan
- Sunita Sarawagi
- Ramakrishnan Srikant

Information Directors:

- Ankur Teredesai (2011–)
- Gabor Melli (2004–2011)
- Ramakrishnan Srikant (1998–2003)

== See also ==
- ACM SIGAI
- ACM SIGMOD
- ICML
- NIPS
- IEEE ICDM
- WWW
