= Suresh Venkatasubramanian =

Indian computer scientist and professor

- Education: IIT Kanpur; Stanford University
- Known for: t-closeness
- Awards: NSF CAREER Award
- Scientific career
- Fields: Computational geometry Data mining Differential privacy
- Workplaces: AT&T Labs; Google; Simons Institute for the Theory of Computing; University of Utah; Brown University
- Thesis: Geometric shape matching and drug design (1999)
- Doctoral advisor: Rajeev Motwani; Jean-Claude Latombe
- Website: http://blog.geomblog.org/

Suresh Venkatasubramanian is an Indian computer scientist and professor at Brown University. In 2021, Prof. Venkatasubramanian was appointed to the White House Office of Science and Technology Policy, advising on matters relating to fairness and bias in tech systems. He was formerly a professor at the University of Utah. He is known for his contributions in computational geometry and differential privacy, and his work has been covered by news outlets such as Science Friday, NBC News, and Gizmodo. He also runs the Geomblog, which has received coverage from the New York Times, Hacker News, KDnuggets and other media outlets. He has served as associate editor of the International Journal of Computational Geometry and Applications and as the academic editor of PeerJ Computer Science, and on program committees for the IEEE International Conference on Data Mining, the SIAM Conference on Data Mining, NIPS, SIGKDD, SODA, and STACS.

== Career ==
Suresh Venkatasubramanian attended the Indian Institute of Technology Kanpur for his BTech and received his PhD from Stanford University in 1999 under the joint supervision of Rajeev Motwani and Jean-Claude Latombe. Following his PhD he joined AT&T Labs and served as an adjunct professor at the University of Pennsylvania where he taught courses on computational geometry and streaming algorithms for GPGPUs. In 2007, he joined the University of Utah School of Computing as the John E. and Marva M. Warnock Presidential Endowed Chair for Faculty Innovation in Computer Science. He received a National Science Foundation CAREER Award in 2010, and in 2013–2014, he was a visiting scientist at the Simons Institute for the Theory of Computing at UC Berkeley and at Google. In 2021, Prof. Venkatasubramanian was appointed to the White House Office of Science and Technology Policy, advising on matters relating to fairness and bias in tech systems, in addition, he moved to Brown University to join the Computer Science department and their Data Science Initiative. At Brown, Prof. Venkatasubramanian will be starting a new center on Computing for the People, to help think through what it means to do computer science that truly responds to the needs of people, instead of hiding behind a neutrality that merely gives more power to those already in power.
