= Gregory Piatetsky-Shapiro =

American computer scientist

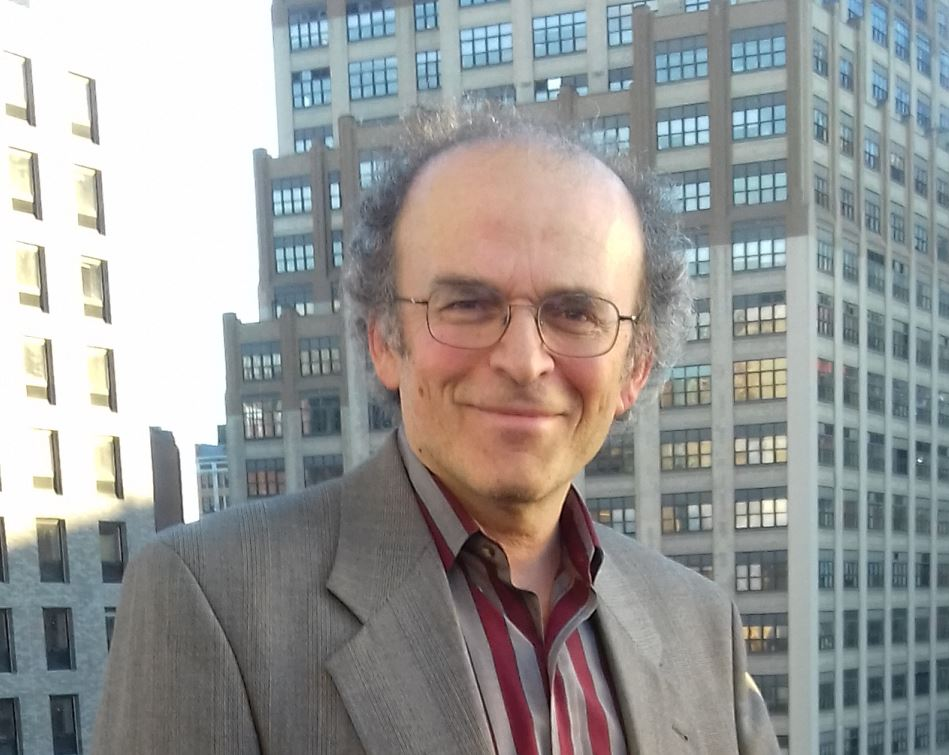
Gregory Piatetsky-Shapiro in NYC

Gregory I. Piatetsky-Shapiro (born 7 April 1958) is a data scientist and the co-founder of the Knowledge Discovery in Databases (KDD) conferences, and co-founder and past chair of the Association for Computing Machinery SIGKDD group for Knowledge Discovery, Data Mining and Data Science. He is the founder and president of KDnuggets, a discussion and learning website for Business Analytics, Data Mining and Data Science.

== Early life ==
A Jewish refugee from Soviet Union, Gregory Piatetsky was born in Moscow, Russia to Inna Mogilevskaya and mathematician Ilya Piatetski-Shapiro. He was admitted in 1970 to Physics-Mathematics School no. 2, a leading math school in Moscow.

In March 1974, Piatetsky emigrated to Israel with his family, studying mathematics and computer science at Tel Aviv University for one semester at Technion. He subsequently earned MS (1979) and Ph.D. (1984) degrees from NYU Courant Institute.

In 1984, his first paper was published in SIGMOD, proving that secondary index selection is NP-complete by reducing it to a set cover problem. In his dissertation, he proved that the greedy method for set cover has a lower bound of 1 - 1/e ~ 63% of the optimal.

== Career ==
He joined GTE Laboratories, where he worked on intelligent interfaces relating to databases. In 1989, he proposed a new project at GTE called "Knowledge Discovery in Databases". The project created advanced prototypes, including KEFIR (Key Findings Reporter), a system for analysis and summarization of key changes in large databases, which was a forerunner of systems like Google Analytics Intelligence. A KEFIR prototype was applied to GTE health care data and received GTE's highest technical award.

In 1997, he left GTE to join Knowledge Stream Partners (KSP), where he was director and later vice president and chief scientist. In April 2000, KSP was acquired by Xchange, Inc., where Piatetsky served as VP and chief scientist.

Piatetsky left Xchange in May 2001 to become a self-employed consultant and focus on KDnuggets.

== KDD and SIGKDD ==
In 1989, Piatetsky organized the first workshop on Knowledge Discovery in Data (KDD-89), held at IJCAI-1989 in Detroit, MI. This workshop had over 60 attendees, including researchers Ross Quinlan and Jaime Carbonell.

Piatetsky organized the next two KDD workshops, in 1991 and 1993. With Usama Fayyad and Ramasamy (Sam) Uthurusamy, he expanded the workshops into an annual international conference on Data Mining and was the General Chair of the KDD-98 conference. He served as the chair of the KDD Steering committee until 1998, when the SIGKDD group was formed as part of ACM to run the annual KDD conference and help promote research in Knowledge Discovery and Data Mining. He served as Director of SIGKDD for 2001–2005 and as SIGKDD Chair for 2005–2009.

In 1997, Piatetsky and Ismail Parsa initiated the KDD Cup competition, which was the world's first open data mining contest.

The annual ACM SIGKDD conference is the leading research conference on Knowledge Discovery and Data Mining, according to Microsoft Academic search and Google Scholar. The 21st ACM SIGKDD conference was held in Sydney, Australia in August 2015.

== KDnuggets ==
In 1993, Piatetsky started Knowledge Discovery Nuggets (KDnuggets) as a newsletter to connect researchers who attended the KDD-93 workshop. With the emergence of the Internet and Mosaic, he and Chris Matheus eventually created the website: Knowledge Discovery Mine, hosted at GTE Labs. The newsletter served as an unofficial publication of KDD workshops. When Piatetsky left GTE Labs, he created the KDnuggets website, with the mission of covering the field with short, concise "nuggets". The resource started as a directory for the subjects of data mining and data science, including Software, jobs, academic positions, CFP (calls for papers), companies, courses, datasets, education, meetings, publications and webcasts.

KDnuggets' main focus is to cover the fields of Business Analytics, Data Mining, and Data Science, including interviews with key leaders. It offers a free data mining course for advanced undergraduates or first-year graduate students.

@KDnuggets Twitter was

- Voted the Best Big Data Tweeter by Big Data Republic (2013)
- In Top 10 Most Influential Brands on Big Data, Onalytica, May 2017.
- No. 1 in Agilience Top Authorities in Machine Learning, Nov 2016.
- No. 1 in Agilience Top Authorities for Data Mining, No. 2 for Data Science, Nov 2016.
- No. 3 in AI Intelligence & Machine Learning: Top 100 Influencers and Brands, Onalytica, Mar 2016.
- No. 4 in Big Data 2016: Top 100 Influencers, Onalytica, Feb 2016.
- In InformationWeek Twitter Top 10 Data Science, Analytics, And BI Feeds, Jan 2016

In February 2015, Piatetsky and Data ScienceTech Institute announced a partnership and he became an honorary member of its scientific advisory board.

== Research and publications ==
In 1991, Piatetsky and William (Bud) Frawley edited their first book Knowledge Discovery in Databases. In 1996, Piatetsky, Usama Fayyad, Padhraic Smyth, and Ramasamy Uthurusamy edited a follow-up Advances in Knowledge Discovery and Data Mining.

Piatetsky also helped launch and co-edit the Data Mining and Knowledge Discovery journal. He authored 9 edited books and collections and over 60 technical papers, articles and book chapters, mostly focusing on data mining and knowledge discovery..

== Recognition ==
- 1984, NYU Award for Best Dissertation in Computer Sciences, PhD Thesis: "A Self-Organizing Database System - A Different Approach to Query Optimization".
- 1985, NYU Award for Best Dissertation in all Natural Sciences (1985).
- 1995, Leslie H. Warner award—GTE's highest for technical achievement—for the KEFIR system.
- 2000, First SIGKDD Service Award, for contributions to Data Mining and Knowledge Discovery.
- 2007 IEEE ICDM Outstanding Service Award, for major contributions to data mining field, 2007.
