= Stochastic roadmap simulation =

For robot control, Stochastic roadmap simulation is inspired by probabilistic roadmap methods (PRM) developed for robot motion planning.

The main idea of these methods is to capture the connectivity of a geometrically complex high-dimensional space by constructing a graph of local paths connecting points randomly sampled from that space. A roadmap G = (V,E) is a directed graph. Each vertex v is a randomly sampled conformation in C. Each (directed) edge from vertex v_{i} to vertex v_{j} carries a weight P_{ij} , which represents the probability that the molecule will move to conformation v_{j} , given that it is currently at v_{i}. The probability P_{ij} is 0 if there is no edge from v_{i} to v_{j}. Otherwise, it depends on the energy difference between conformations.

Stochastic roadmap simulation is used to explore the kinetics of molecular motion by simultaneously examining multiple pathways in the roadmap. Ensemble properties of molecular motion (e.g., probability of folding (P_{Fold}), escape time in ligand-protein binding) is computed efficiently and accurately with stochastic roadmap simulation. P_{Fold} values are computed using the first step analysis of Markov chain theory.

== See also ==
- Jean-Claude Latombe
- Mark Overmars
