= Jean-Claude Latombe =

French-American roboticist

- Born: May 16, 1947 (age 79); Pernes-les-Fontaines, France
- Education: University of Grenoble; National Polytechnic Institute of Grenoble
- Scientific career
- Workplaces: Stanford University; National Polytechnic Institute of Grenoble
- Notable students: Suresh Venkatasubramanian; Lydia E. Kavraki; James J. Kuffner Jr.

Jean-Claude Latombe (born May 14, 1947) is a French-American roboticist and the Kumagai Professor Emeritus in the School of Engineering at Stanford University. Latombe is a researcher in robot motion planning, and has authored one of the most highly cited books in the field.

== Biography ==
Latombe received his dual-Engineering Degree in electrical engineering and computer science from the National Polytechnic Institute of Grenoble (now Grenoble Institute of Technology) in 1969 and 1970, respectively, and a M.S. in electrical engineering in 1972, with the thesis Design of a Computer-Aided Instruction System in Electrical Engineering. In 1977, Latombe received a Ph.D. in computer science from the University of Grenoble with a thesis Artificial Intelligence for Design Automation.

He joined the faculty of INPG in 1980, and left in 1984 to join the Industry and Technology for Machine Intelligence (ITMI), a company he co-founded in 1982. In 1987, Latombe joined Stanford University as an associate professor, and has since been professor (1992), chairman (1997–2000), and Kumagai Professor (2001–present) in the Department of Computer Science. Latombe was elected a Fellow of the Association for the Advancement of Artificial Intelligence in 1993.

== Work ==
Latombe is an important figure in robotic motion planning. After Mark Overmars published the Probabilistic Roadmap Method (PRM) in 1992, Latombe and Lydia Kavraki independently developed the algorithm in 1994, and their joint paper with Overmars, Probabilistic roadmaps for path planning in high-dimensional configuration spaces, is considered one of the most influential studies in motion planning, and has been widely cited (more than 1000 times as of 2008). More recently, Latombe has applied his knowledge in robotics to structural biology problems, and developed the PRM-based Stochastic Roadmap Simulation (SRS) to efficiently generate and analyze large collections of protein trajectories.
