= Diku =

Diku might refer to:

- Emperor Ku (Di Ku, Diku 帝嚳) of ancient China
- DikuMUD, a video game
- Department of Computer Science (University of Copenhagen) (DIKU)
