= Data Mining and Knowledge Discovery =

Peer-reviewed scientific journal

- Discipline: Computer science
- Language: English

Publication details
- History: 1997–present
- Publisher: Springer Science+Business Media
- Frequency: Bimonthly
- Impact factor: 3.67 (2020)

Standard abbreviations
- ISO 4: Data Min. Knowl. Discov.

Indexing
- CODEN: DMKDFD
- ISSN: 1384-5810 (print); 1573-756X (web)
- LCCN: sn98038132
- OCLC no.: 38037443

Links
- Journal homepage; Online access; Online first articles

Data Mining and Knowledge Discovery is a bimonthly peer-reviewed scientific journal focusing on data mining published by Springer Science+Business Media. It was started in 1996 and launched in 1997 by Usama Fayyad as founding Editor-in-Chief by Kluwer Academic Publishers (later becoming Springer). The first Editorial provides a summary of why it was started.

== Academic status ==
Since its founding in 1997, this journal has become the most influential academic journal in the field. Each year, it currently publishes about 60 articles in six issues. It has one of the highest index ratings and is considered authoritative academically.

== Editors in chief ==
The following individuals have served as editor-in-chief of the journal:

- 2023-: Eyke Hüllermeier
- 2015–2023: Johannes Fürnkranz
- 2005–2014: Geoffrey I. Webb
- 1997–2004: Usama Fayyad, Heikki Mannila
  - 2000–2004 with Raghu Ramakrishnan
  - 1997–1998 with Gregory Piatetsky-Shapiro
