= Usama Fayyad =

American computer scientist

Usama M. Fayyad
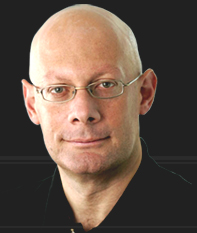
- Born: July 1963 (age 63); Carthage, Tunisia
- Citizenship: Jordan; United States
- Education: University of Michigan (PhD)
- Known for: Expertise in: Data Science & discovery; Data Mining & Big Data; Machine Learning & Applied Data Science
- Scientific career
- Fields: Computer Science Electrical Engineering
- Workplaces: NASA JPL California Institute of Technology, University of Michigan, Ann Arbor, University of Southern California, UTS, HKPU and Monash University; and Adviser to Data Science Institute of Imperial College in London.

Usama M. Fayyad (born July 1963) is a Tunisian-born Jordanian-American data scientist. He is a co-founder of KDD conferences and ACM SIGKDD association for Knowledge Discovery and Data Mining. He is a speaker on Business Analytics, Data Mining, Data Science, and Big Data. He recently left his role as the chief data officer at Barclays Bank.

== Early life ==
Fayyad was born to a Jordanian family in Carthage, Tunisia in July 1963, and lived his early childhood in Tunisia and other countries in the Middle East, Africa and Southern Europe. He graduated high school in Amman, Jordan from the National Orthodox School with GCE O-Levels. He spent most of his life in the U.S., having received his undergraduate and graduate education in Ann Arbor, MI at the University of Michigan.

== Career ==
Fayyad holds BSEs in both electrical and computer engineering (1984); MSE in computer science and engineering (1986); and MSc in mathematics (1989). He also earned his Ph.D. in engineering from the University of Michigan, Ann Arbor (1991). Fayyad has published over 100 technical articles in the fields of data mining, Artificial Intelligence, machine learning, and databases. He holds over 30 patents and is a Fellow of both the AAAI (Association for Advancement of Artificial Intelligence) and the ACM (Association for Computing Machinery). Fayyad has edited two influential books on data mining and he launched and served as editor-in-chief of both the primary scientific journal in the field of data mining (Data Mining and Knowledge Discovery) and the primary newsletter in the technical community published by the ACM: SIGKDD Explorations. He continues to be active in the academic community, serving at chairman of ACM’s SIGKDD Executive Committee which runs the world’s premiere data science, big data, and data mining conferences: the KDD international annual conferences. Fayyad is a recipient of the ACM SIGKDD Innovation Award (2007) and Service Award (2003)—the only person to ever receive both awards.

Fayyad is an active angel investor in the U.S. and in the Middle East. He is also part of the U.S. Dept of State Delegation on Entrepreneurship in the Middle East. Fayyad is an active speaker in both academic and business meetings, and regularly delivers keynotes on BigData, Predictive Analytics, Data Mining, Monetization Strategies, and Early-Stage Investment and Acceleration strategies for technology startups.

From 1989 to 1996 Fayyad held a leadership role at NASA's Jet Propulsion Laboratory (JPL), where his work in the analysis and exploration of Big Data in scientific applications (gathered from observatories, remote-sensing platforms and spacecraft) garnered him the top research excellence award that Caltech awards to JPL scientists – The Lew Allen Award for Excellence in Research, as well as a U.S. Government medal from NASA.

Prior to founding his first startup in 2000, Fayyad was at Microsoft for five years. At Microsoft he led the data mining and exploration group at Microsoft Research and headed the data mining products group for Microsoft's server division – especially SQL Server 2000 and Commerce Server 98. Fayyad’s work at Microsoft Research included the development of innovative data mining algorithms that scaled to very large databases and building up a new research program, as well as a new product line for Microsoft.

In early 2000, he co-founded and served as CEO of Audience Science (originally digiMine, Inc.), a data analysis and data mining company that built, operated and hosted data warehouses and web analytics for enterprises in online publishing, retail, manufacturing, telecommunications and financial services. He led the growth of the company from 3 employees to over 120 employees, raised over $45M in capital from top-tier venture firms. He stepped down as CEO and became chairman in June 2003 in order to start DMX Group. In 2003 Fayyad co-founded and led DMX Group, a data mining and data strategy consulting and technology company that specialized in Big Data Analytics projects for several Fortune 500 clients. DMX Group was acquired by Yahoo! in 2004.

In 2004–2008, Fayyad served as Yahoo!'s Chief Data Officer & Executive VP responsible for Yahoo!'s global data strategy, architecting Yahoo!'s data policies and systems, prioritizing data investments, and managing the company's data analytics and data processing infrastructure (which processed over 25 Terabytes of data per day). He was the industry’s first Chief Data Officer. Under his EVP role, Fayyad also founded and managed the Yahoo! Research Labs organization, which became the premier scientific research organization to develop the new sciences of the Internet, on-line marketing, Microeconomics, and algorithmic Advertising. At Yahoo!, he applied Big Data techniques to content and advertising targeting and built the world’s largest group of data scientists, helping Yahoo! grow its revenues from user targeting by 20 times in four years.

In 2008, Fayyad founded Open Insights, LLC, a technology and consulting firm based in Bellevue, WA.

In 2014, he became chief data officer and group managing director at Barclays PLC, leaving the firm to pursue other interests in early March 2016; he is executive chairman of Oasis 500. He was the first person to ever hold the title chief data officer when Yahoo! Inc acquired his company in June 2004. Prior to Barclays he served as chairman, co-founder and CTO of ChoozOn Corporation —a mobile and web search engine service under the brand Blue Kangaroo.

== KDD and SIGKDD ==
In 1995, Fayyad (with Ramasamy Uthurusamy) co-organized the First International Conference on Knowledge Discovery in Data (KDD-95), held at AAAI-1995 in Montreal, Canada.

An introductory article on Data Mining can be found in a special issue in AI Magazine.

A year later, in 1996, Usama Fayyad launched the journal by Kluwer called Data Mining and Knowledge Discovery as its founding Editor-in-Chief. Later he started the SIGKDDD Newsletter SIGKDD Explorations. The KDD International conference became the primary highest quality conference in Data Mining with an acceptance rate of research paper submissions below 18%. The Journal, Data Mining and Knowledge Discovery, is the primary research journal of the field.

Fayyad also organized the last KDD Workshop in 1994 (Seattle, WA) with Ramasamy (Sam) Uthurusamy (PDF file accessible at AAAI website) and the help of Gregory Piatetsky-Shapiro and transformed the workshops into an annual international conference on Data Mining.

For both his service to the KDD and Data Science fields and his technical contributions in these arenas Usama Fayyad is the only recipient of both ACM SIGKDD Service award and the ACM SIGKDD Innovation Award.

Fayyad was elected and served as a director of the executive committee of ACM SIGKDD when the SIGKDD group was formed as part of ACM to run the annual KDD conferences and help promote research in Data Mining, Data Science, and Knowledge Discovery and Data Mining. Fayyad was elected director of SIGKDD for 2001-2009 and was elected as chairman of the executive committee of SIGKDD for 2009-2013.

The annual ACM SIGKDD conference is the leading research conference on Knowledge Discovery and Data Mining, according to Microsoft Academic search and Google Scholar. The 21st ACM SIGKDD conference was held in Sydney, Australia, on August 2015. Fayyad served as Honorary Conference Chair of KDD-2015 and helped Prof. Longbing Cao and Geoff Webb in organizing this conference.

== Personal life ==
Fayyad was born in Carthage, Tunisia, and lived his early childhood in Tunisia and many countries in the Middle East, Africa, and Southern Europe. He graduated high school in Amman, Jordan from the National Orthodox School with GCE O-Levels. He spent most of his life in the U.S., having received his undergraduate and graduate education in Ann Arbor, MI at the University of Michigan (Ph.D. in engineering in 1991), BSEs in both electrical and computer engineering (1984); MSE in computer science and engineering (1986); and M.Sc. in mathematics (1989) and then lived in Pasadena, CA, Seattle, WA and Portola Valley, CA.

Fayyad has 4 children and now lives in Boston while he continues as chairman of Oasis500 in Jordan, and is an investor in several companies in the U.S. and Europe.
