= Aaron's =

American lease-to-own company

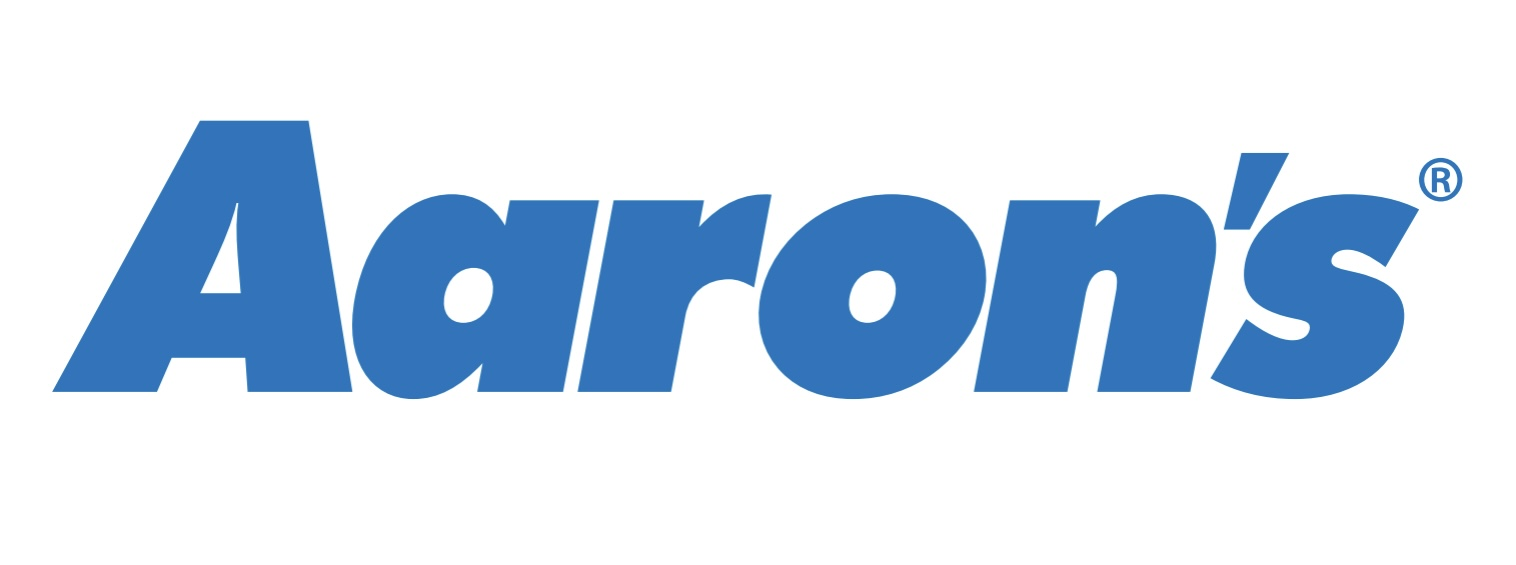
- Type: Private
- ISIN: US0025353006
- Industry: Furniture
- Founded: June 19, 1955; 71 years ago
- Founder: R. Charles Loudermilk
- Headquarters: Atlanta, Georgia, U.S.
- Number of locations: 1,200
- Area served: North America
- Key people: Cory Miller(CEO); Russ Falkenstein (CFO); Stephen Olsen (president)
- Products: Furniture rental; Rent-to-own
- Revenue: ▲US$3.94 billion (2019)
- Operating income: ▼US$105.87 million (2019)
- Net income: ▼US$31.47 million (2019)
- Total assets: ▲US$3.29 billion (2019)
- Total equity: ▲US$1.73 billion (2019)
- Owner: IQVentures (2024–present)
- Number of employees: 9,400 (2020)
- Website: www.aarons.com

The Aaron's Company, Inc., commonly known as Aaron's, is an American lease-to-own retailer. The company focuses on leases and retail sales of furniture, electronics, appliances, and computers. The company sells through company-operated and franchised stores and its e-commerce platform.

An Aaron's store in Dayton, Tennessee

== Locations ==
As of 31 December 2020, the Aaron's Company has 1,340 stores: 1,092 company-operated stores (in 43 states and Canada) and 248 independently owned and operated franchised stores in 35 states and Canada.

== History ==
Aaron Rents, Inc. was founded by R. Charles Loudermilk, Sr. in 1955.

In September 2008, Aaron's announced the sale of its Corporate Furnishings division to CORT Business Services, part of Berkshire Hathaway. Aaron's Corporate Furnishings division, which operated 47 stores, recorded revenues of approximately $99 million in 2007.

As of December 31, 2016, Aaron's had 1,864 stores located in 28 states and the District of Columbia and Canada. In addition, they had 699 independently owned franchised stores in 46 states and Canada.

On July 29, 2020, Aaron's Holdings Company, Inc. announced plans to split into two companies: PROG Holdings, Inc. and The Aaron's Company, Inc. PROG Holdings, with the ticker symbol "PRG", remained in the S&P Midcap 400 stock index but its Global Industry Classification Standard was changed to "Consumer Finance". The Aaron's Company continued to trade under the ticker symbol "AAN" but was moved into the S&P Smallcap 600.

In April of 2022, Aaron's purchased Brandsmart USA, a regional appliance and consumer electronics retailer, for $230 Million.

On October 3, 2024, IQVentures completed the acquisition of the firm for approximately $504 million.

== Controversy ==
In February 2013, customers sued Aaron's for allegedly using spyware on rented computers to send over 185,000 emails to the rental company, including customers' Social Security numbers, passwords and captured keystrokes, as well as explicit images. The Aaron's Company officials had previously said that the company had not installed the spyware, and individual franchisees were responsible. In October 2013, Aaron's agreed to a settlement with the Federal Trade Commission that limited how it used monitoring technology and ordered it to delete customer information that had been improperly collected.

== See also ==
- List of S&P 600 companies
- Furlenco

== Sources ==
- Plunkett, Jack W. (December 2007). Plunkett's Retail Industry Almanac 2008. ISBN 978-1-59392-101-9.
