= Johannes Gehrke =

German computer scientist

- Education: KIT; UT Austin; UW Madison
- Known for: Research on database systems, data science, and data privacy
- Awards: Sloan Research Fellowship (2003); Humboldt Prize (2010); Blavatnik Award for Young Scientists (2011)
- Scientific career
- Fields: Computer science
- Workplaces: Microsoft; Cornell University; FAST; MPI-SWS
- Academic advisors: Raghu Ramakrishnan
- Website: www.cs.cornell.edu/johannes/, www.microsoft.com/en-us/research/people/johannes/

Johannes Gehrke is a Technical Fellow at Microsoft focusing on AI. He is an ACM Fellow, an IEEE Fellow, and he received the 2011 IEEE Computer Society Technical Achievement Award and the 2021 ACM SIGKDD Innovation Award. From 1999 to 2015, he was a faculty member in the Department of Computer Science at Cornell University, where at the time of his leaving he was the Tisch University Professor of Computer Science.

Gehrke is best known for his contributions to database systems, data mining, and data privacy. He developed some of the fastest data mining algorithms for frequent pattern mining, sequential pattern mining, and decision tree construction and one of the first sensor network query processors which pioneered in-network query processing for wireless sensor networks, and he is known for his work on data privacy. His work on data privacy resulted in a new version of OnTheMap published by the US Census Bureau, the very first public data product published by any official government agency in the world with provable privacy guarantees (using a variant of Differential Privacy).

== Education ==
Johannes Gehrke studied from 1990 to 1993 computer science at the Karlsruhe Institute of Technology; he received an M.S. degree from the Department of Computer Science at the University of Texas at Austin in 1995 and a PhD from the University of Wisconsin, Madison in 1999 for a thesis in data mining.

== Career ==
From 1999 to 2015, Gehrke was a professor in the Department of Computer Science at Cornell University. His research group was popularly known as the Big Red Data Group, and he graduated 25 PhD students. From 2005 to 2008, he was Chief Scientist at Fast Search and Transfer. He has been in product groups at Microsoft since 2012, first building Delve and the Office Graph, then building people and feed experiences across all of Microsoft 365, and then serving as chief architect and head of AI of the Microsoft Teams backend. From 2020 to 2023, he had a dual role across research and product, managing all of Microsoft Research in Redmond and CTO and head of AI for the Microsoft Teams backend.

Gehrke received a National Science Foundation Career Award, a Sloan Research Fellowship, and a Humboldt Research Award. In 2011, he received the IEEE Computer Society Technical Achievement Award and a Blavatnik Award for Young Scientists. In 2014, he became a Fellow of the Association for Computing Machinery, and in 2020 he was elected an IEEE Fellow. In 2021, he received the ACM SIGKDD Innovation Award, which "recognizes individuals for their outstanding technical contributions to the field of knowledge discovery in data and data mining that have had lasting impact in furthering the theory and/or development of commercial systems."

== Books ==
Since its second edition, Gehrke has been a co-author of one of the main textbooks on database systems, commonly known as the Cow Book.
