= Geoff Webb =

Australian computer scientist

Geoffrey I. Webb
- Citizenship: Australia
- Scientific career
- Fields: Data Science; Computer Science; Artificial Intelligence; Machine Learning; Computational Biology
- Institutions: Monash University Department of Data Science and Artificial Intelligence

Geoffrey I. Webb (also known as Geoff Webb) is Professor in the Department of Data Science and Artificial Intelligence at Monash University, founder and director of Data Mining software development and consultancy company G. I. Webb and Associates, and former editor-in-chief of the journal Data Mining and Knowledge Discovery.

He is an editor of the Encyclopedia of Machine Learning.

Webb is a foundation member of the editorial advisory board of the journal Statistical Analysis and Data Mining.

Webb was elected to the ACM Special Interest Group on Knowledge Discovery and Data Mining Executive Committee in 2017.

In 2025, Webb was awarded an Australian Laureate Fellowship by the Australian Research Council to further his research and develop tools to enable temporal analytics in artificial intelligence.
