= Isabelle Augenstein =

German Scientist in Denmark

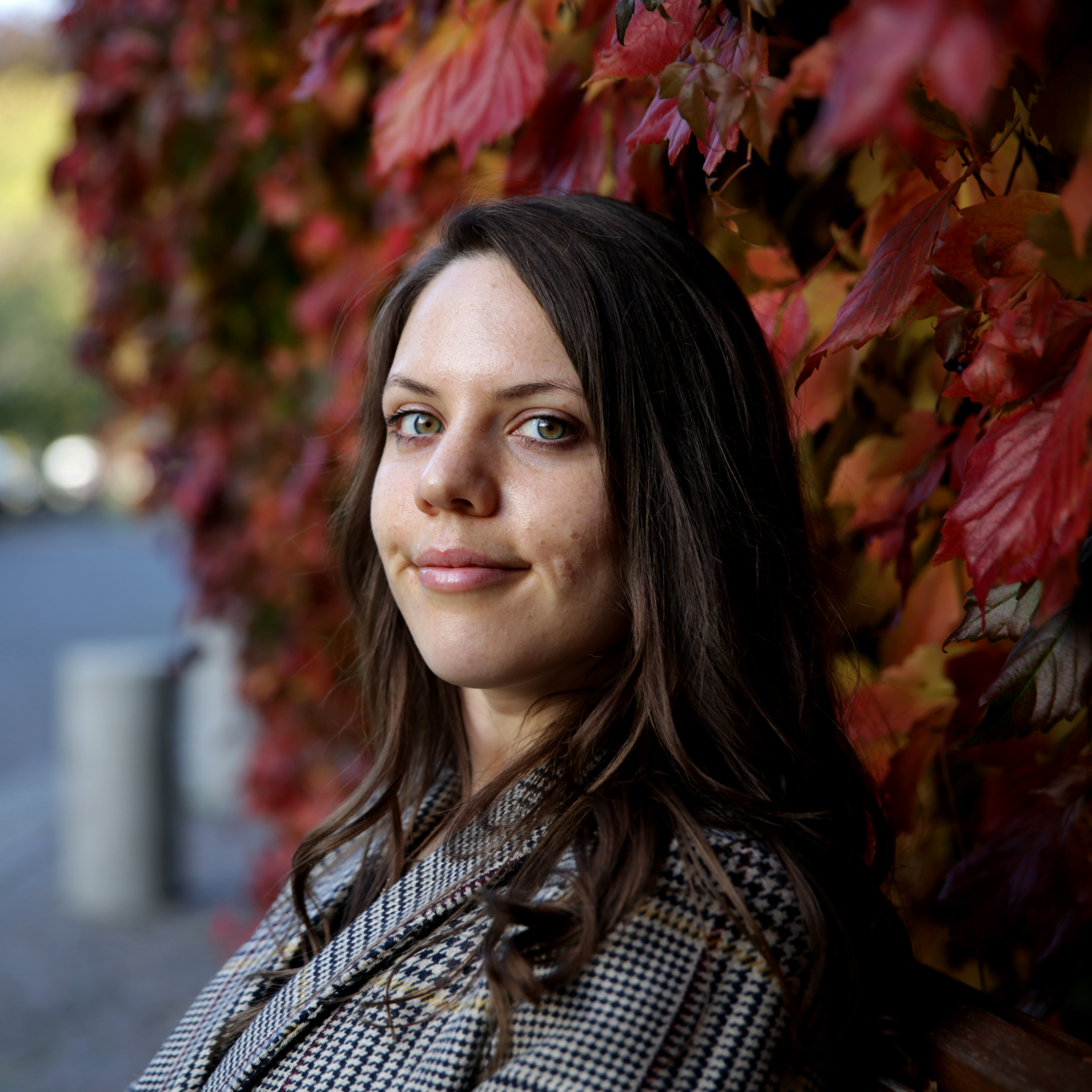
- Education: Heidelberg University; University of Sheffield
- Scientific career
- Fields: Natural language processing
- Workplaces: University of Copenhagen

Isabelle Augenstein is a computer scientist working in the field of natural language processing. She is currently a full professor and head of the NLP section at the Department of Computer Science, University of Copenhagen. She is also a co-lead at the Pioneer Centre for Artificial Intelligence, Denmark's largest research centre, which was initiated by the Danish Ministry of Higher Education and Science. She is well known for being appointed the youngest female full professor in Denmark and for her work on detecting gender bias, fact-checking, and stance detection using computational methods.

== Early life and education ==
Isabelle Augenstein grew up in South-West Germany, attending a gymnasium in Pforzheim, a city between Stuttgart and Karlsruhe. She did her undergraduate studies in Computational Linguistics and Psychology at Heidelberg University. She earned a Master of Arts in Computational Linguistics at Heidelberg University. She went on to work as a Research Assistant at AIFB, Karlsruhe Institute of Technology. For her doctoral studies, she moved to the UK, getting a PhD in computer science from the University of Sheffield. She worked under the supervision of Dr. Diana Maynard and Prof. Fabio Ciravegna, writing a thesis on Web Information Extraction using Linked Data. In 2021, she also earned a Habilitation while at the University of Copenhagen in Explainable Fact-checking.

== Career ==
Upon graduating from University of Sheffield, Augenstein joined the Machine Reading Group at University College London as a post-doctoral researcher, working with Sebastian Riedel. She then joined University of Copenhagen as a Tenure-Track Assistant Professor. She was promoted to Associate and eventually Full Professor and Head of the Natural Language Processing Section at the University of Copenhagen, where she still serves in that capacity. She was also the Deputy Head of Research and Founding Employee at Checkstep, a startup focused on content moderation. In 2020, she was awarded a Sapere Aude fellowship from Independent Research Fund Denmark. From August 2021 - June 2024, she was a member of the Young Academy, a scientific forum for excellent young researchers. Since then, she has joined as a member of the Royal Danish Academy of Sciences and Letters. She was awarded a European Research Council Starting Grant, a grant supporting up-and-coming independent research leaders, for her project on Explainable and Robust Fact-checking. She was also the recipient of the 2023 Hartmann Foundation Diploma Award, awarded to younger people who within Danish society are expected to give a valuable effort after showing promising results of general social value in social, humanitarian, scientific or cultural areas.

== Research ==
Augenstein works in the area of natural language processing. She has published over 100 peer-reviewed research articles and her work has been cited over 8,000 times. Her early work was on relation extraction and building NLP methods for Semantic Web. She went on to publish influential work on Rumour and Stance Detection including the most cited paper on Stance Detection. She is well known for her work on fact-checking, gender bias, and explainability, which has often attracted media attention. She was honored with the Karen Spärck Jones Award in 2024 by the British Computing Society and Bloomberg for her significant experimental contributions to advancing the understanding of Natural Language Processing (NLP)

== Miscellaneous ==
Augenstein is one of the founders of Widening NLP, a group seeking to increase the proportion of women and minorities working in natural language processing. She also holds a black belt in the martial arts of Taekwondo.
