= Corinna Cortes =

Danish computer scientist (born 1961)

- Born: 31 March 1961 (age 65); Denmark
- Education: University of Copenhagen (MS); University of Rochester (PhD)
- Known for: Support vector machines MNIST database
- Awards: Paris Kanellakis Award (2008); ACM Fellow (2023)
- Scientific career
- Fields: Machine learning Data mining
- Workplaces: Google; UCPH Department of Computer Science; AT&T Bell Labs; Bell Labs
- Thesis: Prediction of generalization ability in learning machines (1994)
- Doctoral advisor: Randal C. Nelson
- Website: research.google/people/author121

Corinna Cortes (born 31 March 1961) is a Danish computer scientist known for her contributions to machine learning. She is a Vice President at Google Research in New York City. Cortes is an ACM Fellow and a recipient of the Paris Kanellakis Award for her work on theoretical foundations of support vector machines.

== Early life and education ==
Corinna Cortes was born in 1961 in Denmark. Cortes received her Master of Science degree in physics from University of Copenhagen in 1989. She received her PhD in computer science from the University of Rochester in 1993 for research supervised by Randal C. Nelson.

== Career and research ==
Cortes joined AT&T Bell Labs as a researcher in 1993. Since 2003, she has served as Vice President of Google Research, New York City, and since 2011, as adjunct professor at the UCPH Department of Computer Science. She is serves as an editorial board member of the journal Machine Learning.

Cortes' research covers a wide range of topics in machine learning, including support vector machines (SVM) and data mining. SVM is one of the most frequently used algorithms in machine learning, which is used in many practical applications, including medical diagnosis and weather forecasting. At AT&T, Cortes was a contributor to the design of Hancock programming language.

=== Awards and honours ===
In 2008, she jointly with Vladimir Vapnik received the Paris Kanellakis Award for the development of a highly effective algorithm for supervised learning known as support vector machines (SVM). She was named an ACM Fellow in 2023 for theoretical and practical contributions to machine learning, industrial leadership and service to the field.

== Personal life ==
Corinna has two children and is also a competitive runner.
