= Kasper Hornbæk =

- Born: Kasper Hornbæk; June 25, 1972 (age 54); Roskilde, Denmark
- Education: University of Copenhagen
- Known for: Usability in HCI
- Scientific career
- Fields: Computer Science
- Workplaces: University of Copenhagen
- Doctoral advisor: Erik Frøkjær

Kasper Hornbæk is a professor of computer science at the University of Copenhagen. He was inducted into the CHI Academy in 2020.

Kasper Hornbæk received both his M.Sc. as well as his Ph.D. in computer science from the University of Copenhagen. He is best known for his work on usability in human-computer interaction.

He is section head of the Human Centered Computing group at the UCPH Department of Computer Science.

In 2020 he was inducted into the CHI Academy.
