= Dr. B. R. Ambedkar National Institute of Technology Jalandhar =

Public engineering institute located in Jalandhar, Punjab, India

Dr. B. R. Ambedkar National Institute of Technology, Jalandhar
- Logo of the NIT Jalandhar
- Former name: Regional Engineering College Jalandhar
- Motto: Saraswati Namastubhyam
- Motto in English: Hail Sarasvati
- Type: Institute of National Importance
- Established: 1987; 39 years ago
- Affiliations: Ministry of Education
- Endowment: Ministry of Education, Government of India
- Chairperson: J. S. Yadav
- Director: Binod Kumar Kanaujia
- Location: Jalandhar, Punjab, India; 31.39587°N 75.53584°E
- Campus: Urban,154 acres (0.62 km^{2})
- Colours: Blue; White
- Nickname: NITians
- Website: www.nitj.ac.in

Dr. B. R. Ambedkar National Institute of Technology Jalandhar (NIT Jalandhar or NITJ), formerly Regional Engineering College Jalandhar, is a public engineering university located in Jalandhar, Punjab, India established in 1987. It has been declared as an Institute of National Importance under the Ministry of Human Resource Development, Govt of India. It is a member of the National Institutes of Technology (NITs) system, a group of premier Indian technical institutes governed by the Council of NITSER on 2002. It was founded as a joint venture between the state and the central government, originally under the name Regional Engineering College, Jalandhar, Punjab, India (RECJ). RECJ (now NITJ) was established in 1989 by the joint venture of Govt of India and Govt of Punjab on the Land of Village Bidhipur and Village Suranussi of District Jalandhar (Punjab) on the Grand Trunk Road bye-pass.

== History ==
Dr B R Ambedkar National Institute of Technology was established in 1987 as Regional Engineering College and was given the status of National Institute of Technology (Deemed University) by the Government of India on 17 October 2002, under the aegis of Ministry of Human Resource Development, New Delhi. The Ministry of Human Resource Development, Government of India has declared the Institute as "Institute of National Importance" under the act of Parliament-2007.

== Campus ==
The Institute campus is widespread over an area of 154 acres. It includes teaching facilities and residence buildings for students and staff, plus several amenities.

In 2019 ISRO launched their space incubation centre at NIT Jalandhar.

=== Housing ===
The students of National Institute of Technology, Jalandhar are drawn from all parts of the country. There are seven (plus one extension to hostel number 7) boys' hostels, two girls' hostels, and a mega girls' hostel. A mega hostel with three blocks was recently constructed. The facilities of the reading room, indoor games, etc. are available in each hostel. Internet facility is provided in every hostel. Other facilities like geysers, water purifiers, and Washing Machines are provided in all the hostels. The residential accommodation in hostels comprises cubicles and dormitories which have four-seater, two-seater, and one-seater facilities allotted on the basis of the year and course of study the student is pursuing. There are badminton courts, volleyball court, and special reading rooms which provide a good environment in the hostels.

== Organisation and administration ==
=== Departments ===
IT Building, the Department of Computer Science and Engineering

The various academic departments in the institute offer course based degree programmes and also degree programmes that are inclined towards research. There are 15 academic departments in the institute. All the departments have the doctoral programme.

== Academics ==
=== Admissions ===
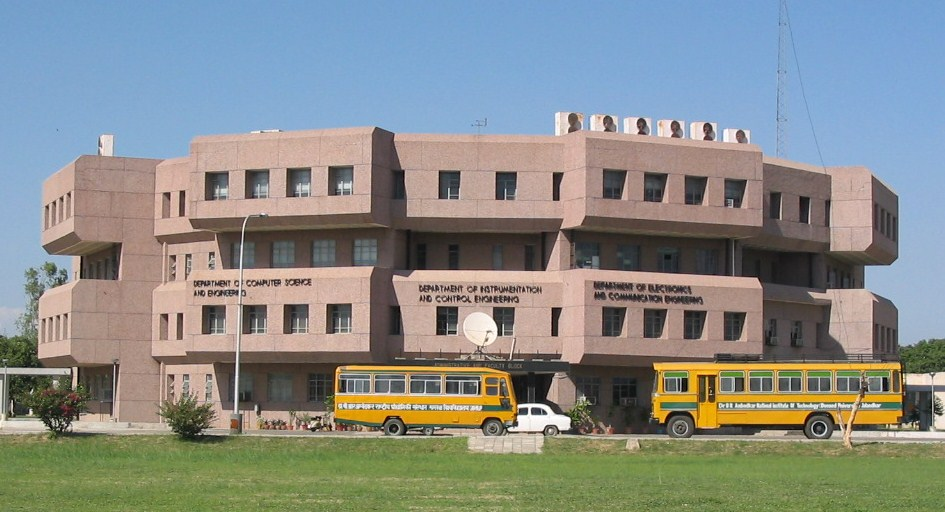
Main building of NIT-J

The admissions to the B. Tech programs is run by JoSSA (Joint Seat Allocation Authority). Students were admitted on the basis of All India Engineering Entrance Examination (AIEEE) till 2012 but from 2013 the admission is based on Joint Entrance Examination Main (JEE Main) conducted across India. Total seats for B.Tech. is 652 for 2011 admissions. For the session of 2019–2020, the seats for B.Tech. had increased by 33% and 874 students were admitted for B.tech courses. Similarly, the number of postgraduate seats were also doubled. As of 2019, there are 3854 students in Graduate and postgraduate programs of the institute. Admissions to the MTech programs are by the GATE exam conducted by the IIT and IISc. The postgraduate admission is on the basis of research and interviews by the appropriate screening committees.

=== Placements ===
The institute is regularly visited by Indian and foreign multinational corporations for offering jobs to final-year B.Tech. and M.Tech. students. A large number of reputed Industrial houses in the country visit the Institution and select the final year students as Engineers/ Management Trainees. Some of the Companies invite the students to their Corporate Offices for the interviews. Major companies like Microsoft, Amazon, Infosys, Reliance Petrochemicals Limited, Hero Motor corp.

=== Ranking ===
University rankings

Engineering – India
- NIRF (2023): 46
- NIRF (2024): 58

In 2024 NIRF Rankings, the institute was ranked 58 among the top 100 engineering colleges of India.In 2025 It has been ranked 55. It ranked 33rd among all government engineering colleges according to a survey conducted by India Today in 2022.

== Student life ==
=== Cultural festivals ===
Demonic Resurrection performing at Khamosh (the Rocknite at Utkansh-09)

TechNITi: A techno-management fest that is conducted during the odd semester in mid-September. The fest involves events from all the departments, including from robotics, workshops, guest lectures, and informals.

Utkansh: A cultural fest that is conducted during the even semester, which aims at drawing out the creative side of the techies on campus. The event is usually a three-day affair that occurs during the end of March. Each day usually has theme-based events; previous themes have included folk, rock, Kavi Sammelan (poets meet), comedy, theatre, fusion, etc.

== Notable alumni ==
- Anindya Ghose - Director, Stern School of Business
- Upasan Taku - Co-founder, MobiKwik
- Ali Hyder Rizvi - Director, Morgan Stanley
- Ajit Mohan Karimpana, CEO, Furlenco
- Abhishek Parakh, Professor, Kennesaw State University
