= Lydia Kavraki =

Greek computer scientist

Lydia E. Kavraki Λύδια Καβράκη
- Born: Heraklion, Crete, Greece
- Occupations: Noah Harding Professor of Computer Science - Rice University, Greek-American computer scientist

Lydia E. Kavraki (Greek: Λύδια Καβράκη) is a Greek-American computer scientist, an honorary doctorate of the University of Crete and the Noah Harding Professor of Computer Science, a professor of bioengineering, electrical and computer engineering, and mechanical engineering at Rice University. She is also the director of the Ken Kennedy Institute at Rice University. She is known for her work on robotics/AI and bioinformatics/computational biology and in particular for the probabilistic roadmap method for robot motion planning and biomolecular configuration analysis.

== Biography ==
Kavraki was born in Heraklion and did her undergraduate studies at the University of Crete. She then moved to Stanford University for her graduate studies, earning a Ph.D. in 1995 under the supervision of Jean-Claude Latombe.

== Awards and honors ==
In 2000, Kavraki won the Grace Murray Hopper Award for her work on probabilistic roadmaps. In 2002, Popular Science magazine listed her in their "Brilliant 10" awards, and in the same year MIT Technology Review listed her in their annual list of 35 innovators under the age of 35. In 2010, she was elected as a Fellow of the Association for Computing Machinery "for contributions to robotic motion planning and its application to computational biology." She is also a fellow of the Association for the Advancement of Artificial Intelligence, a fellow of IEEE, a fellow of AIMBE and a fellow of the American Association for the Advancement of Science. In 2015, she was the winner of the ABIE Award for Technical Leadership from the Anita Borg Institute. In 2017, Kavraki was honored with the ACM Athena Lecturer award from the Association for Computing Machinery, which celebrates women researchers who have made fundamental contributions to the field of Computer Science. In 2020, she was awarded the ACM IEEE Allen Newell Award. In 2025, she was elected to the National Academy of Engineering.

Kavraki is a member of the National Academy of Medicine (formerly Institute of Medicine (IoM)), the Academy of Athens, the Academy of Medicine, Engineering and Science of Texas (TAMEST), the Academia Europaea, the American Academy of Arts and Sciences, and the National Academy of Sciences.
