= Chih-Jen Lin =

Taiwanese computer scientist

- 林智仁
- Born: 1971 (age 54–55)
- Education: National Taiwan University (BS); University of Michigan (MS, PhD)
- Known for: LIBSVM
- Awards: ACM Fellow (2015); AAAI Fellow (2014); IEEE Fellow (2011)
- Scientific career
- Fields: machine learning data mining optimization
- Institutions: National Taiwan University
- Thesis: Studies in large-scale optimization
- Website: www.csie.ntu.edu.tw/~cjlin/

Chih-Jen Lin (Chinese: 林智仁; pinyin: Lín Zhìrén) is a Taiwanese computer scientist who is a distinguished professor of computer science at National Taiwan University, and a leading researcher in machine learning, optimization, and data mining. He is best known for the open-source library LIBSVM, an implementation of support vector machines. With his students he also developed LIBLINEAR, a widely used library for large-scale linear classification.

== Biography ==
Chih-Jen Lin earned a B.S. (1993) in mathematics at National Taiwan University, and an M.S.E. (1996) and a Ph.D. (1998) in Industrial and Operations Engineering at the University of Michigan.

Lin's machine-learning software has been adopted by industry, with his libraries used by Yahoo, Google, eBay, and Microsoft. He has held visiting research positions, as a visiting scientist at Yahoo! Research (2006–2007) and visiting professor at Google Research (2008), and as a visiting scholar at Alibaba in 2017.

== Awards and honors ==
- ACM Fellow (2015), for contributions to the theory and practice of machine learning and data mining
- TECO Award (2015) in Electrical Engineering, Information and Communication Technology
- AAAI Fellow (2014), for contributions to machine learning and the development of widely used SVM software; he was the first researcher from Taiwan to be elected an AAAI Fellow
- Best Paper Award (2013), ACM Conference on Recommender Systems
- IEEE Fellow (2011), for contributions to support vector machine algorithms and software
- Best Paper Award (2010), ACM SIGKDD Conference

== Selected works ==
=== Software ===
- LIBSVM implements the sequential minimal optimization algorithm for kernelized support vector machines. LIBSVM Homepage
- LIBLINEAR, a library for large-scale linear classification. LIBLINEAR Homepage

=== Articles ===
- Chang, Chih-Chung; Lin, Chih-Jen (2011). "LIBSVM: A library for support vector machines". ACM Transactions on Intelligent Systems and Technology. 2 (3). doi:10.1145/1961189.1961199. S2CID 961425.
