= Sensor network query processor =

User-friendly interface for programming and running applications

A sensor network query processor (SNQP), also called a sensorDB, is a user-friendly interface for programming and running applications which translates instructions from declarative programming language with high-level instructions to low-level instructions understood by the operating system. The basic idea of SNQP is the addition of a layer modeling the WSN as a distributed database searchable by a query language similar to SQL.

== TinyDB ==
TinyDB is a query processing system for extracting information from a network of TinyOS sensors. Unlike existing solutions for data processing in TinyOS, TinyDB does not require embedded C code for sensors. Instead, TinyDB provides a simple, SQL-like interface to specify the data desired, along with additional parameters, as the rate at which data should be refreshed— much like a traditional database. Given a query specifying data interests, TinyDB collects that data from motes in the environment, filters it, aggregates it, and routes it to a PC. TinyDB does this via power-efficient in-network processing algorithms.

== QLowpan ==
QLowpan is a sensor network queries processor for resource-constrained sensor devices. In order to guarantee interoperability between the different platforms, QLowpan is based on RPL/6LoWPAN protocol. It is the first sensor network queries processor which is compatible with 6lowpan protocol.
