= Anindya Ghose =

Anindya Ghose (born c. 1974) is an Indian-born American academic, and the Heinz Riehl Chair Professor of Business at New York University's Stern School of Business and the director of the Masters of Business Analytics & AI program at NYU Stern.

== Life and work ==
Ghose received a B.Tech in Instrumentation and Control Engineering in 1996 from NIT Jalandhar in India, an MBA in 1998 from the Indian Institute of Management Calcutta (IIMC), and a MS in 2002 and a PhD in Management Sciences in 2004 from Carnegie Mellon University.

He teaches for the Master of Science in Business Analytics Program for Executives (MSBA), which is jointly hosted by NYU Stern and NYU Shanghai and in the UG, MBA, TRIUM and EMBA programs.
