= UCPH Department of Computer Science =

Department at University of Copenhagen

Coordinates: 55°42′08″N 12°33′41″E

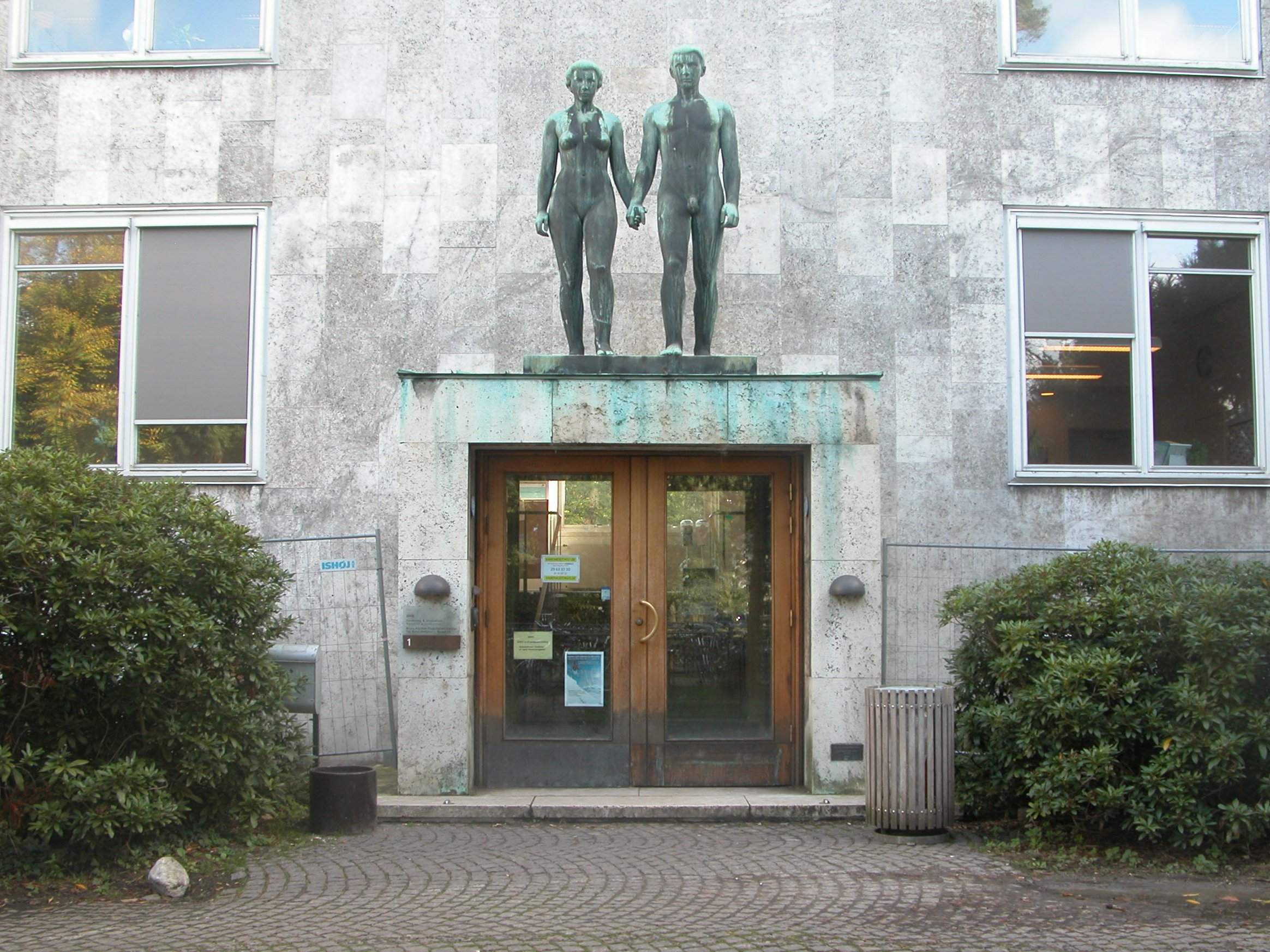
- Entrance of the main building, located at the University Park in Copenhagen, on the university's North Campus
- Type: Public
- Established: 1970; 56 years ago
- Parent institution: University of Copenhagen, Faculty of Science
- Head of Department: Professor Jakob Grue Simonsen
- Location: Copenhagen, Denmark
- Website: di.ku.dk
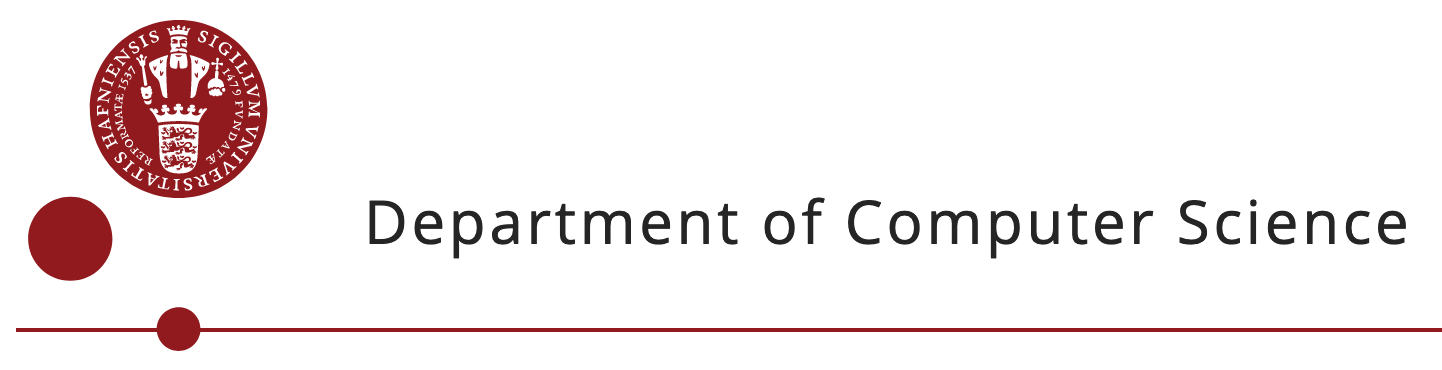

The UCPH Department of Computer Science (Danish: Datalogisk Institut, DIKU) is a department in the Faculty of Science at the University of Copenhagen (UCPH). It is the longest established department of Computer Science in Denmark and was founded in 1970 by Turing Award winner Peter Naur. As of 2021, it employs 82 academic staff, 126 research staff and 38 support staff. It is consistently ranked the top Computer Science department in the Nordic countries, and in 2017 was placed 9th worldwide by the Academic Ranking of World Universities.

== History ==
DIKU has its roots at the Institute for Mathematical Sciences, where in 1963, the first computer was bought. In 1969, Peter Naur became the first professor in Computer Science at the University of Copenhagen, and in 1970, DIKU was officially established its own department.

== Research ==
As of 2021, the department is home to 82 academic staff, 126 research staff and 38 support staff. Research is organised into seven research sections:

- The Algorithms and Complexity Section, headed by Mikkel Thorup, who conduct basic algorithms research, as well as research on data structures and computational complexity
- The Human‐Centered Computing Section, headed by Kasper Hornbæk, who research human-computer interaction, computer-supported cooperative work, as well as health informatics
- The Image Section, headed by Kim Steenstrup Pedersen, who work on image processing including medical image processing, computer vision, physics based animation and robotics.
- The Machine Learning Section, headed by Christina Lioma, researching theoretical machine learning, information retrieval, and machine learning in biology
- The Natural Language Processing Section, headed by Isabelle Augenstein, who conduct research on core natural language processing, natural language understanding, computational linguistics, as well as multimodal learning
- The Programming Languages and Theory of Computation section, headed by Martin Elsman, researching programming languages, theory of computation, computer security, and approaches to financial transparency
- The Software, Data, People & Society Section, headed by Thomas Troels Hildebrandt, who work on decentralised systems, data management systems, and process modelling

== Teaching ==
The department offers programmes at BSc as well as MSc level, both in core computer science and in interdisciplinary subjects. Bachelor's programmes are 3-year programmes and mostly taught in Danish, whereas Master's programmes are 2-year programmes and taught in English. In 2020, DIKU enrolled 610 new Bachelor's students and 136 new Master's students. As of 2021, DIKU offers the following study programmes:

- Bachelor of Science (BSc) in Computer Science
- Bachelor of Science (BSc) in Machine Learning and Data Science
- Bachelor of Science (BSc) in Computer Science and Economy
- Bachelor of Science (BSc) in Communication and IT
- Bachelor of Science (BSc) in Health and IT
- Master of Science (MSc) in Computer Science
- Part-time Master of Science (MSc) in Computer Science
- Master of Science (MSc) in IT and Cognition
- Master of Science (MSc) in Communication and IT

In addition, the department awards the research degree Doctor of Philosophy (PhD). PhD students are enrolled in the Faculty of Science's Doctoral School for a typical study period of between three and four years.

== Location ==
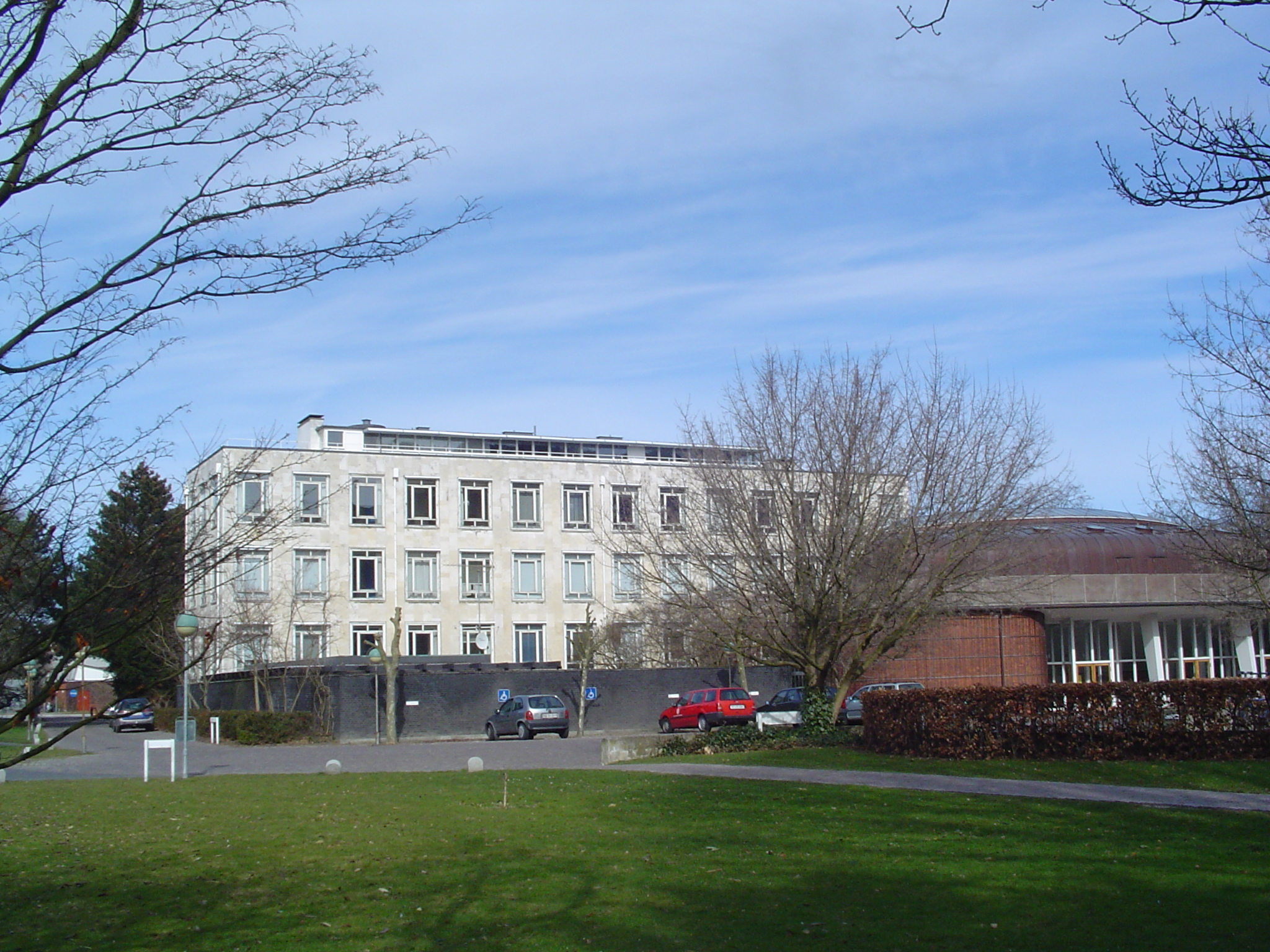
DIKU

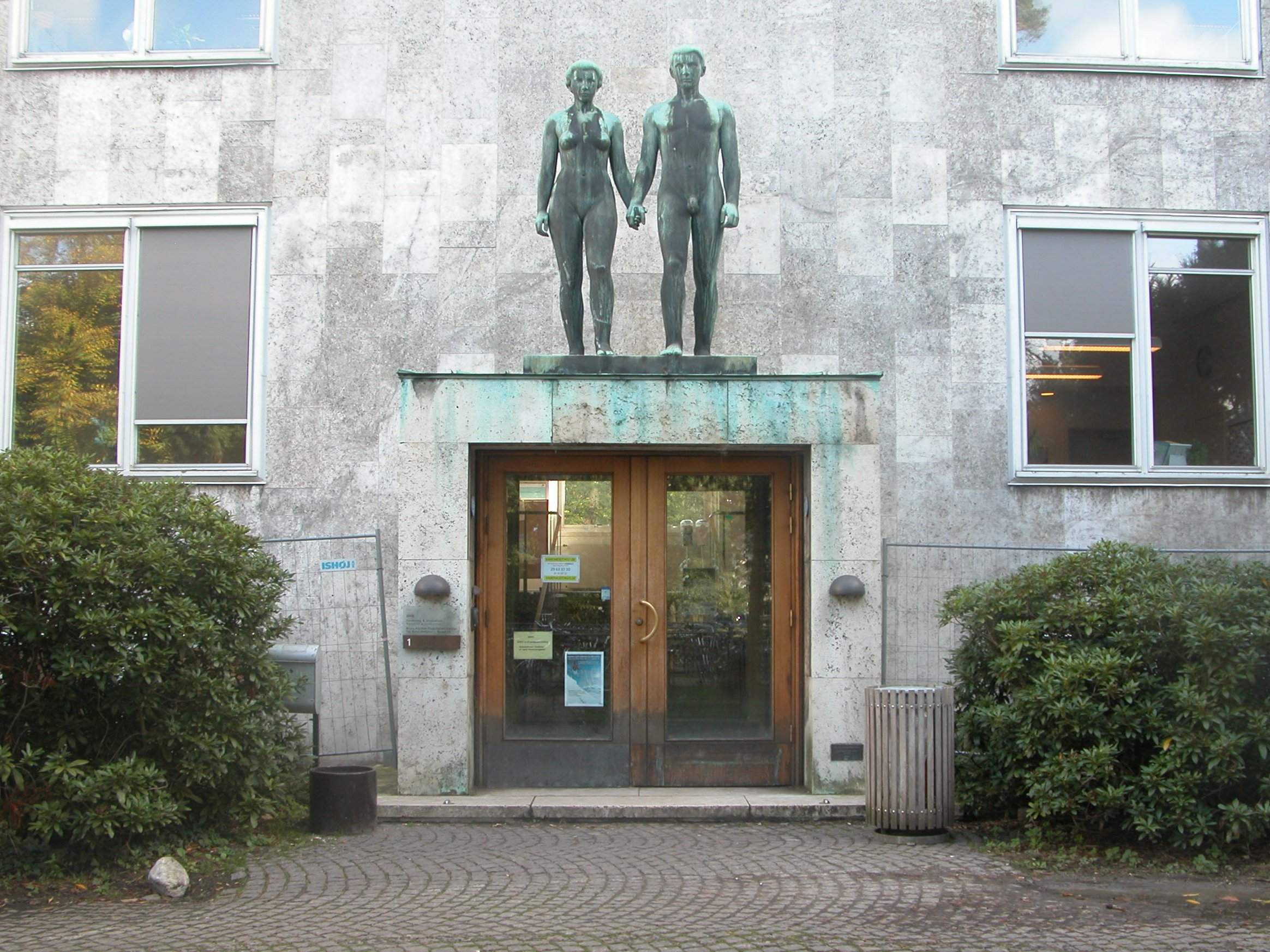
The entrance

DIKU is based at University Park in Copenhagen, part of the university's North Campus. Its building complex comprises the former Department of Anatomy. The building was completed in 1942 to design by Kaj Gottlob.

The Human-Centered Computing Section is located in Sigurdsgade, close to the North Campus.

== Student life ==
An important social event is the DIKU revue which is held each year in June. The DIKU revue is always in competition with the physics revue and never misses an opportunity to computer-animate the complete and utter destruction of the physics institute at the H. C. Ørsted Institute.

As something unique among the institutes of Copenhagen University, the DIKU canteen is entirely student driven and open 24 hours. It is the natural hub for all social events on DIKU.

The two largest social events are the DIKU revue and the Julefrokost (Christmas lunch) of the canteen.

== Notable faculty ==
- Corinna Cortes, who co-developed the highly influential supervised machine learning method support vector machines, has been an adjunct professor at the department since 2011.
- Mikkel Thorup, best known for his work on shortest path problem in undirected graphs, has been a professor at the department since 2013.
- Kasper Hornbæk, who won a SIGCHI Lifetime Achievement Award for his work on usability in human-computer interaction, has been a professor at the department since 2014.
- Serge Belongie, known for his work on object recognition and image segmentation, has been a professor at the department since 2021.
- Isabelle Augenstein, known for her research on natural language processing, and for being appointed the youngest female full professor in Denmark in October 2022.

== Notable alumni ==
- Peter Naur, a Turing Award recipient, was a professor at the department between 1969 and 1998.
- Per Brinch Hansen, a IEEE Computer Pioneer Award winner, was a professor at the department between 1984 and 1987.
- Mads Tofte, the first managing director of the IT University of Copenhagen and co-developer of the Standard ML programming language, who graduated with a MSc in Computer Science and Mathematics in 1984.
- Michael Seifert, a Danish computer programmer who developed the popular multiplayer text-based role-playing game DikuMud, was a BSc then MSc student at the department from 1990 to 1996.

== Miscellaneous ==
The domain diku.dk was registered on October 29, 1987, and was one of the first .dk domain names to be registered.

The popular DikuMUD codebase was developed at DIKU in March 1990, and derives its name from the institute.

In the 1994 Danish thriller Nattevagten (Nightwatch) directed by Ole Bornedal, the main entrance and stairwell of the institute was used as a main location.
