= Ramasamy Uthurusamy =

Ramasamy Uthurusamy is a computer engineer at Oakland University in Rochester, Michigan. He was named a Fellow of the Institute of Electrical and Electronics Engineers (IEEE) in 2013 for his contributions to data mining and artificial intelligence.
