= Furlenco =

Online furniture rental platform

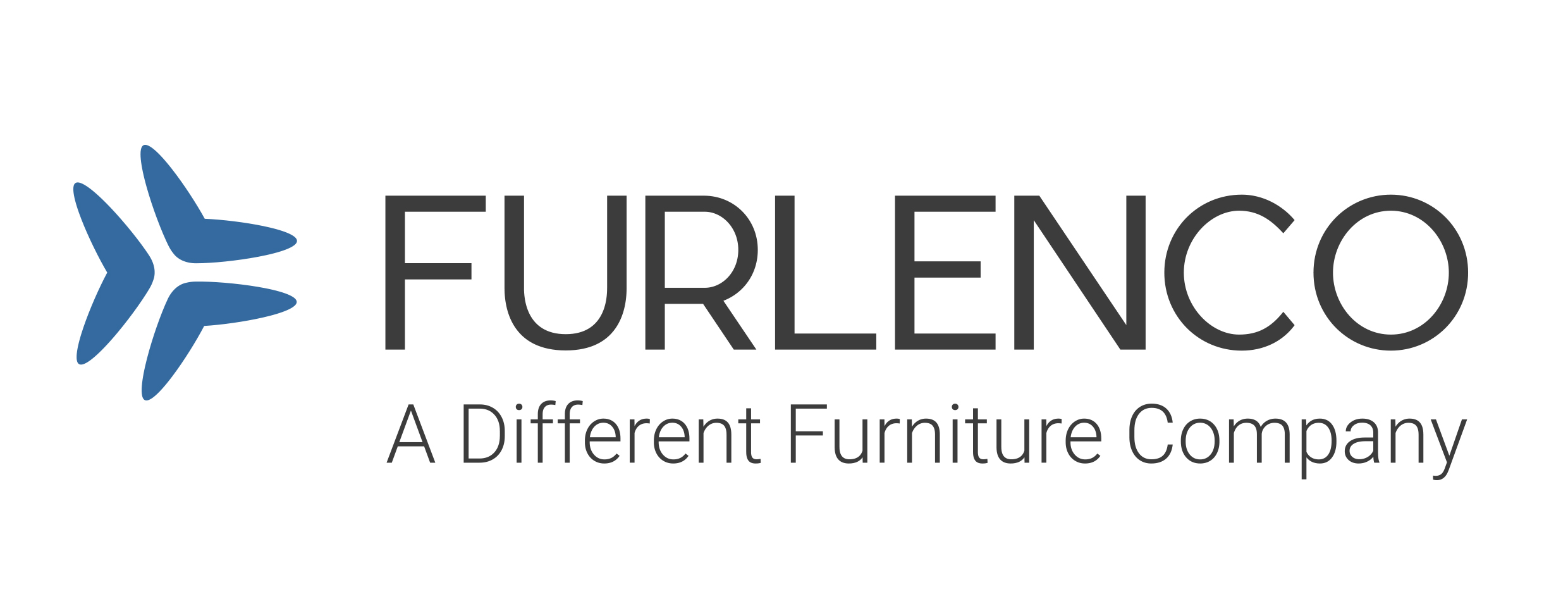
- Company type: Private
- Website type: Online retailing
- Headquarters: Bangalore, India
- Country of origin: India
- Area served: India
- Key people: Ajith Mohan Karimpana CEO & founder, Ashwin Venkataraman COO, Gaurav Sharma Chief Strategy Officer & Chief Customer Officer, Lohith V Chief Technology Officer
- Industry: Home & Furniture
- Products: Furniture
- Parent: House of Kieraya Private Limited
- Website: www.furlenco.com
- Launched: 2012

Furlenco is an Indian online furniture rental platform that was incorporated in 2012.

== History ==
Furlenco was founded by Ajith Karimpana, an engineering graduate from NIT Jalandhar and alumnus of Temple University. It was incorporated in 2012. Before starting his own venture, Karimpana was serving as Vice President of Goldman Sachs in the US. He also has worked for Infosys Technologies and Morgan Stanley. The company is owned and operated by Bangalore-based Kieraya Furnishing Solutions. Initially, the company started as Rent Ur Duniya but was later renamed to Furlenco. In December 2016, Furlenco partnered with Airbnb to offer personalized home interiors. It also partnered with Uber, Pocket Aces, CORT, The Viral Fever, NoBroker, Dharma Productions for 'Badrinath Ki Dulhania', and Red Chillies Entertainment for 'Dear Zindagi'

== Funding ==
The company raised $30 million in October 2016. Furlenco had secured $6 million in its Series A funding round led by LightBox VC in March 2015. Earlier, the company had received funds amounting to $100k via angel funding.

In April 2020, the company closed $10 million (approx ₹76.4 crore) debt and equity financing round led by existing investors.

== Business model ==
Furlenco offers furniture for entire homes on a monthly rental subscription model. Furlenco's rents for living rooms, bedrooms, and dining rooms.
