= Sunita Sarawagi =

Indian computer scientist

- Born: India
- Citizenship: Indian
- Education: Indian Institute of Technology Kharagpur (B.Tech.), University of California, Berkeley (Ph.D.)
- Awards: Infosys Prize (2019)
- Scientific career
- Fields: Databases, Machine learning, Artificial intelligence
- Workplaces: Indian Institute of Technology Bombay
- Website: https://www.cse.iitb.ac.in/~sunita/

Sunita Sarawagi is an Indian computer scientist known for her research in databases, data mining, and machine learning, including the use of natural language processing to extract structured data from text. She is Institute Chair Professor of Computer Science and Engineering at IIT Bombay.

== Education and career ==
Sarawagi earned a bachelor's degree in computer science from IIT Kharagpur in 1991. She went to the University of California, Berkeley for graduate study in computer science with database expert Michael Stonebraker, earning a master's degree in 1993 and completing her Ph.D. in 1996, with the master's thesis Efficient Organization of Large Multidimensional Arrays and doctoral dissertation Query Processing in Tertiary Memory Databases.

After working as a researcher for IBM Research at the Almaden Research Center in San Jose, California, she became an assistant professor at IIT Bombay in 1999. She was promoted to associate professor in 2003 and full professor in 2014. She was founding head of the Center for Machine Intelligence and Data Science at IIT Bombay.

== Recognition ==
Sarawagi was the winner of the 2019 Infosys Prize in Engineering and Computer Science "for her research in databases, data mining, machine learning and natural language processing, and for important applications of these research techniques".

She was awarded IIT Kharagpur's Distinguished Alumni Award in 2019. She was named to the Indian National Academy of Engineering in 2013, and was elected as a 2021 ACM Fellow "for contributions to statistical machine learning for information analysis, extraction, and integration".
