= Probabilistic roadmap =

Probabilistic motion planning algorithm

The probabilistic roadmap planner is a motion planning algorithm in robotics, which solves the problem of determining a path between a starting configuration of the robot and a goal configuration while avoiding collisions.

An example of a probabilistic random map algorithm exploring feasible paths around a number of polygonal obstacles

The basic idea behind PRM is to randomly sample points from the configuration space of the robot, test the samples for whether they are in the free space, and use a local planner to attempt to connect these configurations to other nearby configurations. The starting and goal configurations are added in, and a graph search algorithm is applied to the resulting graph to determine a path between the starting and goal configurations.

The probabilistic roadmap planner consists of two phases: a construction and a query phase. In the construction phase, a roadmap (graph) is built, approximating the motions that can be made in the environment. First, a random configuration is created. Then, it is connected to some neighbors, typically either the k nearest neighbors or all neighbors less than some predetermined distance. Configurations and connections are added to the graph until the roadmap is dense enough. In the query phase, the start and goal configurations are connected to the graph, and the path is obtained by a Dijkstra's shortest path query.

Given certain relatively weak conditions on the shape of the free space, PRM is provably probabilistically complete, meaning that as the number of sampled points increases without bound, the probability that the algorithm will find a path, if one exists, approaches one. The rate of convergence depends on certain visibility properties of the free space, where visibility is determined by the local planner. Roughly, if each point can "see" a large fraction of the space, and also if a large fraction of each subset of the space can "see" a large fraction of its complement, then the planner will find a path quickly.

The invention of the PRM method is credited to Lydia E. Kavraki. There are many variants on the basic PRM method, some quite sophisticated, that vary the sampling strategy and connection strategy to achieve faster performance. See e.g. Geraerts & Overmars (2002) for a discussion.
