= Raghu Ramakrishnan =

- Education: University of Texas, Indian Institute of Technology Madras
- Scientific career
- Fields: Computer Science
- Workplaces: University of Wisconsin–Madison, Yahoo! Research, Microsoft Research

Raghu Ramakrishnan is a researcher in the areas of database and information management. He is a Technical Fellow at Microsoft. He has been a Vice President and Research Fellow for Yahoo! Inc.

Ramakrishnan spent 22 years as a professor at the University of Wisconsin–Madison. With Johannes Gehrke, he authored the popular textbook Database Management Systems, also known as the "Cow Book".

Ramakrishnan received a bachelor's degree from IIT Madras in 1983, and a Ph.D. from the University of Texas at Austin in 1987. He has been selected as an ACM Fellow (2001) and a Packard fellow, and has done pioneering research in the areas of deductive databases, data mining, exploratory data analysis, data privacy, and web-scale data integration. The focus of his work in 2007 was community-based information management.

Since 2012, Ramakrishnan has been working at Microsoft, heading Cloud and Information Services Lab (CISL) and leading the development of Azure Data Lake.

== Bibliography ==
- Ramakrishnan, R. (1998). Database management systems. Boston, MA: WCB/McGraw-Hill.
- Ramakrishnan, R., & Gehrke, J. (2000). Database management systems (2nd ed.). Boston, MA: McGraw-Hill.
- Ramakrishnan, R., & Gehrke, J. (2003). Database management systems (3rd ed.). Boston, MA: McGraw-Hill.
