= Foster Provost =

American computer scientist

- Citizenship: United States
- Education: Duquesne University, University of Pittsburgh
- Scientific career
- Fields: Data Science; Computer Science; Information Systems
- Workplaces: New York University Stern School of Business
- Notable students: Claudia Perlich; Shawndra Hill; Maytal Saar-Tsechansky

Foster Provost is an American computer scientist, information systems researcher, and Professor of Data Science, Professor of Information Systems and Ira Rennert Professor of Entrepreneurship at New York University's Stern School of Business. He is also the Director for the Data Science and AI Initiative at Stern's Fubon Center for Technology, Business and Innovation. Professor Provost has a Bachelor of Science from Duquesne University in physics and mathematics and a Master of Science and Ph.D. in computer science from the University of Pittsburgh. Professor Provost received an honorary doctorate (Doctor Honoris Causa) in Business and Economics from the University of Antwerp in March 2025.

Professor Provost is known for his work on evaluating machine learning algorithms and AI systems, for his work on applying ROC analysis to AI systems, for his work on social network data analysis, for his work on combining humans and machine learning, and for his work on machine learning for targeted marketing, online advertising, and activity monitoring.

He has won awards for his work, including:

- The 2020 ACM SIGKDD Test of Time Award
- The 2017 European Research Paper of the Year (AIS & CIONET).
- The best paper in the journal Information Systems Research in 2015.
- The 2009 INFORMS Design Science award for social network-based marketing,
- IBM Faculty Awards for outstanding research in data mining and machine learning,
- A President's Award from NYNEX Science and Technology
- Best Paper Awards from the ACM SIGKDD conference in 1997, 2008, and 2012, and
- Awards in SIGKDD's annual KDDCUP data mining competition.

Professor Provost was on the founding teams for five startups, including Dstillery, Integral Ad Science (IAS), Everyscreen Media, Predicube, and Detectica.

Professor Provost is coauthor (with Tom Fawcett) of the book, Data Science for Business, which often tops Amazon's best-seller lists in data mining and data modeling.

Professor Provost was a Scientific Advisor for the ISI Foundation (which awards the Lagrange Prize), served as Editor-in-Chief of the journal Machine Learning for 6+ years. He is a member of the editorial boards of the Journal of Machine Learning Research (JMLR) and the journal Data Mining and Knowledge Discovery (DMKD/DAMI). He was elected as a founding board member of the International Machine Learning Society.
