= Padhraic Smyth =

American computer scientist

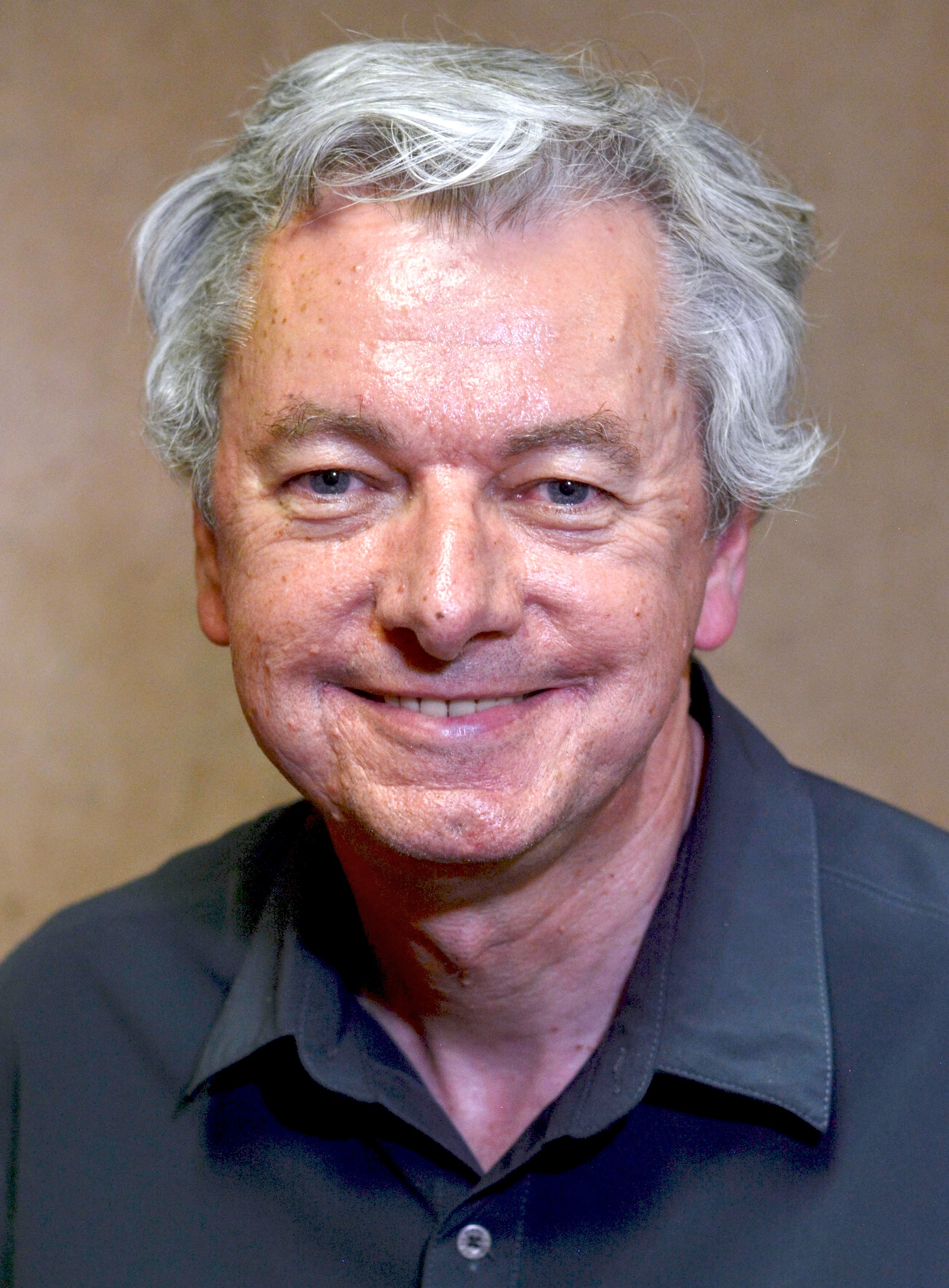
- UC Irvine Professor Padhraic Smyth
- Born: 1962 (age 63–64); Kilmovee, County Mayo, Ireland
- Education: California Institute of Technology
- Awards: AAAI Fellow (2010); ACM Fellow (2013)
- Scientific career
- Workplaces: Jet Propulsion Laboratory; Donald Bren School of Information and Computer Sciences
- Thesis: The Application of Information Theory to Problems in Decision Tree Design and Rule-Based Expert Systems (1998)
- Doctoral advisor: Rodney M. Goodman
- Website: www.ics.uci.edu/~smyth/

Padhraic Smyth is a Distinguished Professor of Computer Science serving as the inaugural Hasso Plattner Endowed Chair in Artificial Intelligencein UC Irvine's Donald Bren School of Information and Computer Sciences. He also serves as Director of UC Irvine's Data Science Initiative and Associate Director for UC Irvine's Center for Machine Learning and Intelligent Systems. He was elected a fellow of the Association for the Advancement of Artificial Intelligence in 2010 "for significant contributions to the theory and practice of statistical machine learning".
