= Ed Davey =

British politician (born 1965)

The Right Honourable Sir Ed Davey MP FRSA
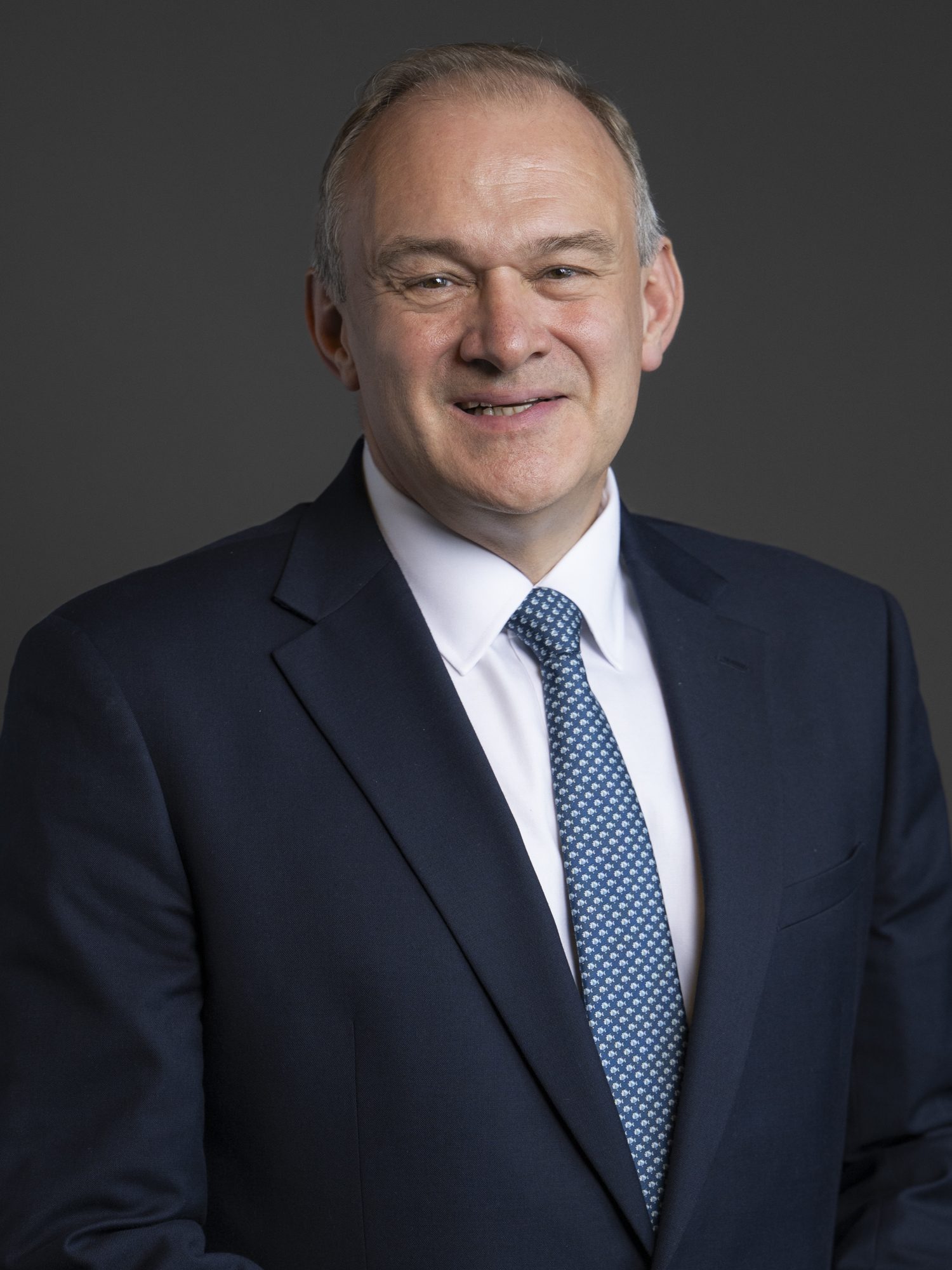
- Official portrait, 2024

Leader of the Liberal Democrats
- Incumbent
- Assumed office 27 August 2020 (Note: Served as acting leader with Sal Brinton from 13 December 2019 to 1 January 2020 and with Mark Pack from 1 January to 27 August 2020.)
- Deputy: Daisy Cooper
- President: Mark Pack; Josh Babarinde
- Preceded by: Jo Swinson

Deputy Leader of the Liberal Democrats
- In office 3 September 2019 – 27 August 2020
- Leader: Jo Swinson; Himself (acting); Sal Brinton (acting); Mark Pack (acting)
- Preceded by: Jo Swinson
- Succeeded by: Daisy Cooper

Secretary of State for Energy and Climate Change
- In office 3 February 2012 – 8 May 2015
- Prime Minister: David Cameron
- Preceded by: Chris Huhne
- Succeeded by: Amber Rudd

Parliamentary Under-Secretary of State for Employment Relations and Consumer Affairs
- In office 20 May 2010 – 3 February 2012
- Prime Minister: David Cameron
- Preceded by: Anthony Young
- Succeeded by: Norman Lamb

Member of Parliament for Kingston and Surbiton
- Incumbent
- Assumed office 8 June 2017
- Preceded by: James Berry
- Majority: 17,235 (34.1%)
- In office 1 May 1997 – 30 March 2015
- Preceded by: Richard Tracey (Surbiton); Norman Lamont (Kingston upon Thames)
- Succeeded by: James Berry

Liberal Democrat portfolios
- 1997–2002: Chief Secretary to the Treasury
- 2002–2005: Office of the Deputy Prime Minister
- 2005–2006: Education and Skills
- 2006–2007: Trade and Industry
- 2007–2010: Foreign and Commonwealth Affairs
- 2015: Energy and Climate Change
- 2017–2019: Home Affairs
- 2019: Business, Energy and Industrial Strategy
- 2019–2020: Treasury

Personal details
- Born: Edward Jonathan Davey; 25 December 1965 (age 60) Mansfield, Nottinghamshire, England
- Party: Liberal Democrats
- Spouse: Emily Gasson (m. 2005)
- Children: 2
- Education: Jesus College, Oxford (BA); Birkbeck, University of London (MSc)
- Website: www.eddavey.org

Sir Edward Jonathan Davey (born 25 December 1965) is a British politician who has served as Leader of the Liberal Democrats since 2019. He served in the Cameron–Clegg coalition as Secretary of State for Energy and Climate Change from 2012 to 2015 and as Deputy Leader to Jo Swinson in 2019. An "Orange Book" liberal, he has been Member of Parliament (MP) for Kingston and Surbiton since 2017, a seat he previously held from 1997 to 2015.

Davey was born in Mansfield Woodhouse, Nottinghamshire. After both his parents died before he was 16, Davey was raised by his grandparents, and subsequently attended Nottingham High School. He then went on to study at Jesus College, Oxford, and Birkbeck, University of London. He worked as an economics researcher and financial analyst before being elected to the House of Commons. Davey served as a Liberal Democrat spokesperson to Charles Kennedy, Menzies Campbell and Nick Clegg from 2005 to 2010, in various portfolios including education and skills, trade and industry, and foreign and Commonwealth affairs.

In 2010, after the Liberal Democrats entered into a coalition government with the Conservative Party, Davey served as Parliamentary Under-Secretary of State for Employment Relations, Consumer and Postal Affairs from 2010 to 2012, and in David Cameron's Cabinet as Secretary of State for Energy and Climate Change from 2012 to 2015, following Chris Huhne's resignation. Davey focused on increasing competition in the energy market by removing barriers to entry for smaller companies, and by streamlining the process of customer switching. He also approved the construction of Hinkley Point C nuclear power station. As postal affairs minister, Davey did not investigate the details of the Post Office Horizon scandal that had led to the wrongful prosecution of hundreds of sub-postmasters, but was the only Post Office minister to meet Alan Bates, the founder of the Justice for Subpostmasters Alliance.

Davey lost his seat in the 2015 general election and was knighted in the 2016 New Year Honours for political and public service. He regained his seat in the 2017 general election, and served as the Liberal Democrat Home Affairs spokesperson from 2017 to 2019. After the retirement of Vince Cable, Davey unsuccessfully ran against Jo Swinson in the 2019 Liberal Democrats leadership election, and was later appointed Liberal Democrat Treasury spokesperson and elected unopposed as the Deputy Leader of the Liberal Democrats. After Swinson lost her seat at the 2019 general election, Davey, while remaining deputy leader, served as acting leader alongside Liberal Democrat presidents Baroness Brinton and Mark Pack from December 2019 to August 2020.

Davey stood in the 2020 Liberal Democrats leadership election, in which he defeated Layla Moran with 63.5% of the vote. In his campaign he said that he would prioritise defeating the Conservatives and ruled out working with them following the 2024 general election. With Davey as their leader, the Liberal Democrats made gains alongside Labour in the 2024 local elections, where the Liberal Democrats finished second for the first time in a local election cycle since 2009. In the 2024 general election Davey led his party both to their highest ever number of seats and to the highest number of seats for a third party since 1923, and was noted, with praise and criticism, for his campaign stunts. He was re-elected unopposed as Liberal Democrat leader in 2024 and led his party to further gains in the 2025 local elections.

== Early life and career ==
Edward Davey was born on 25 December 1965 in Mansfield Woodhouse, Nottinghamshire. His father John (1932 – March 1970), a solicitor, died when Davey was four years old from cancer. His mother, Nina Davey (née Stanbrook), died 11 years later when Davey was 15, after which he was brought up by his maternal grandparents in the village of Eakring. Davey acted as a carer for his terminally ill mother before her death, and also cared for his grandmother.

Davey was in both the 90th Nottingham Scout group and the 17th Nottingham Air Scout group. He sang in the local church choir, St John's. Like his two brothers, Davey received the Duke of Edinburgh's Gold Award, meeting Prince Philip on 2 March 1984 when the Prince visited his school, the private Nottingham High School, where Davey was head boy. He took A-levels in German, French and History. One of his two brothers attended Trent Polytechnic, becoming a solicitor. After leaving school, Davey attended Jesus College, Oxford, where he was awarded a first class BA degree in philosophy, politics and economics in 1988. He was JCR President.

In 1989, he became an economics researcher for the Liberal Democrats, principally to Alan Beith, the party's then-Treasury spokesman, whilst studying at Birkbeck College, London, for a master's degree (MSc) in economics. He was closely involved in the development of Liberal Democrat policies such as an additional penny on income tax to fund education, and central bank independence, for the 1992 general election. From 1993 to 1997, he worked in business forecasting and market analysis for management consultancy firm Omega Partners.

== Parliamentary career (1997–2015) ==
Davey was elected to the House of Commons, at his first attempt, in the 1997 general election, where he defeated Richard Tracey, the sitting Conservative MP for the former constituency of Surbiton, with a majority of just 56 votes, and remained the seat's MP for 18 years. In his maiden speech, on 6 June 1997, he gave his support for the setting up of the London Assembly, but was against the idea of a directly elected Mayor of London; he also spoke of the effects governmental cuts were having on education delivery in the Royal Borough of Kingston upon Thames.

In 1998, he was the primary sponsor of an early day motion supporting the repeal of the Greenwich judgment, which prevents local authorities from giving their own residents priority access to school places.

In 2001, he opposed government proposals for restrictions on gambling machines, which he described as a "silly bit of nanny state politics".

In January 2003, Davey publicly backed local constituent and NHS whistleblower Ian Perkin, who alleged he had been sacked from his director of finance role for exposing statistics manipulation at St George's NHS healthcare trust. Davey condemned the NHS bureaucracy as "Stalinist" and called for an inquiry into Perkin's case, while personally meeting trust executives to discuss the case on behalf of Perkin.

In February 2003, Davey introduced the clause which repealed the prohibition of "promotion of homosexuality" under Section 28 of the Local Government Act 1988. The legislation was repealed in March. He was one of the contributors to The Orange Book (2004).

In 2006, Davey was one of eight Liberal Democrat MPs, including Jeremy Browne and Mark Oaten, who opposed a total ban on smoking in clubs and pubs. He called the ban "a bit too nanny state".

In an article for the Financial Times in 2007, Davey and LSE economist Tim Leunig proposed a new system of community land auctions through sealed bids with a new tax, to take place before the land was given planning permission. They suggested that councils could take in tax the difference between the land owner's asking price and the highest bidder's offer, claiming this would stimulate development and the revenue then used to lower other taxation.

=== Lib Dem spokesperson ===
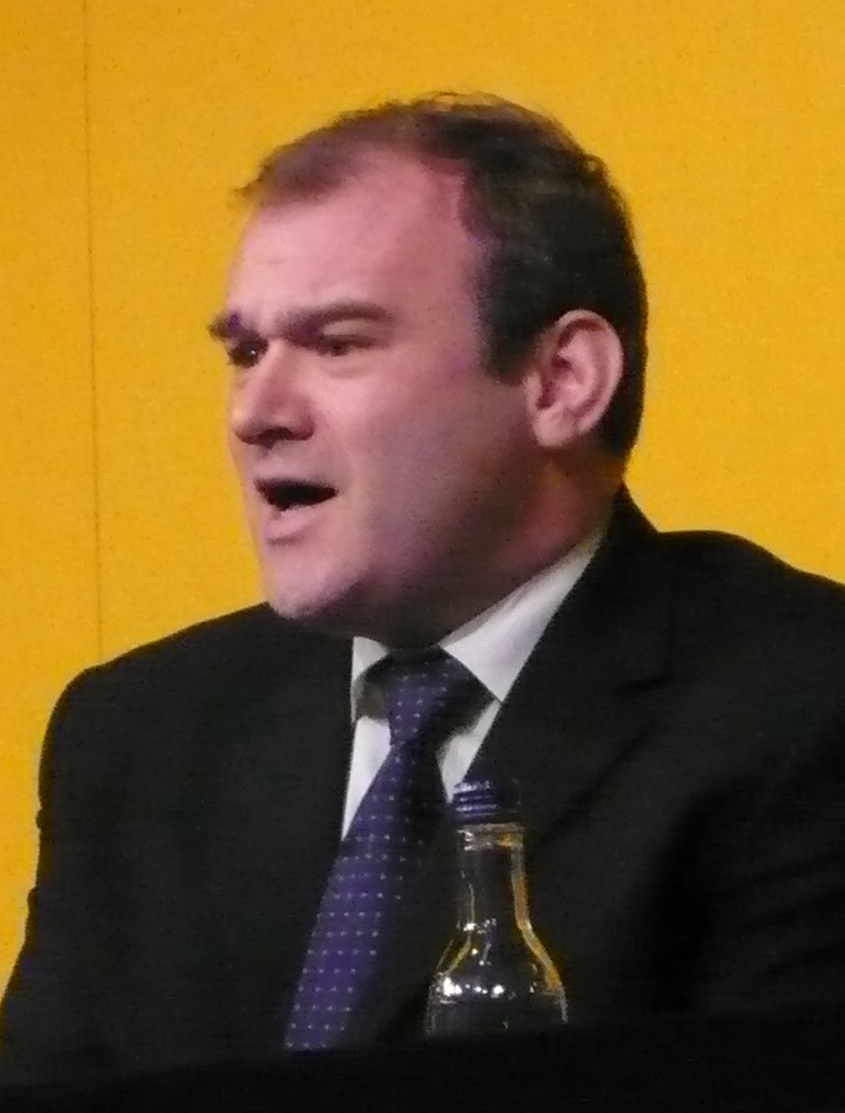
Davey in 2008

Following Davey's election to parliament in 1997, he was appointed as the Lib Dem's spokesman on Treasury Affairs. He added the post of whip in 1998, and as the spokesman on London from 2000.

Davey was re-elected in the 2001 general election, increasing his share of the vote from 36.7% to 60.2%. He increased his majority from just 56 to 15,676, beating former Conservative MP David Shaw. He joined the Liberal Democrat frontbench under Leader Charles Kennedy in the same year when he was appointed the party's spokesperson for Treasury matters. In 2002, he became the Liberal Democrat spokesperson for the Office of the Deputy Prime Minister. He was appointed spokesperson for Education and Skills in 2005, before becoming spokesperson for Trade and Industry in March 2006. In December 2006, he succeeded Norman Lamb as Chief of Staff to Menzies Campbell, the new party leader. Davey was chair of the party's Campaigns and Communications Committee. Following Nick Clegg's election as Leader of the Liberal Democrats, Davey was awarded the Foreign Affairs brief, and continued to retain his chairmanship of the party's Campaigns and Communications Committee.

On 26 February 2008, Davey was suspended from parliament for the day for ignoring a warning from the Deputy Speaker. He was protesting about the exclusion by the Speaker of a Liberal Democrat motion to debate and vote on whether the UK should have a referendum on staying in the EU.

At the 2009 Liberal Democrat conference, Davey caused controversy by calling for dialogue with the Taliban, through declaring that it was "time for tea with the Taliban", a comment echoed by Malala Yousafzai four years later to the BBC.

== Ministerial career (2010–2015) ==
=== Parliamentary Under-Secretary of State for Business (2010–2012) ===
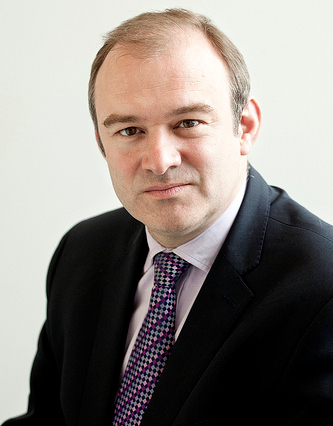
Davey's portrait as Minister for Employment Relations, circa 2012

Following the Conservative–Liberal Democrat coalition agreement, after the 2010 general election, Davey was appointed Parliamentary under-secretary of state in the Department for Business, Innovation and Skills with responsibility for Employment Relations, Consumer and Postal Affairs. In addition, he was appointed as the Minister of State for Trade Policy. As a Parliamentary Under Secretary, Davey led the establishment of an unofficial 'like-minded group for growth' ginger group within the European Union, convening several economically liberal European governments behind an agenda of deregulation, free trade, liberalisation of services and a digital single market. He was involved in the provisional application phase of the Free Trade Agreement between the EU and South Korea.

In January 2011, he faced protests by postal workers in his Kingston and Surbiton constituency for his role in the privatisation of Royal Mail. Also in 2011, Davey announced several reforms to the labour market, mainly aimed at improving labour market flexibility. These reforms included cuts to red tape and easing dismissal laws, and were accompanied by reviews from the Institute of Economic Affairs into compensation payments and the TUPE. Davey also announced that the government would abolish the default retirement age.

As Minister for Postal Affairs, Davey did not investigate the details of the Horizon Post Office scandal that had led to the wrongful prosecution of hundreds of sub-postmasters. He was, however, the only Post Office minister to meet Alan Bates, the founder of the Justice for Subpostmasters Alliance, with this meeting taking place in October 2010. Following criticism in 2024, Davey expressed regret and said that he had been misled by Post Office officials. Following Paula Vennells's decision to hand back her CBE over her role during the scandal, Davey came under pressure to return his knighthood because of his role during it. However, Davey said he was "completely surprised" as to why the Conservatives had awarded Vennells a CBE in 2019.

=== Secretary of State for Energy and Climate Change (2012–2015) ===
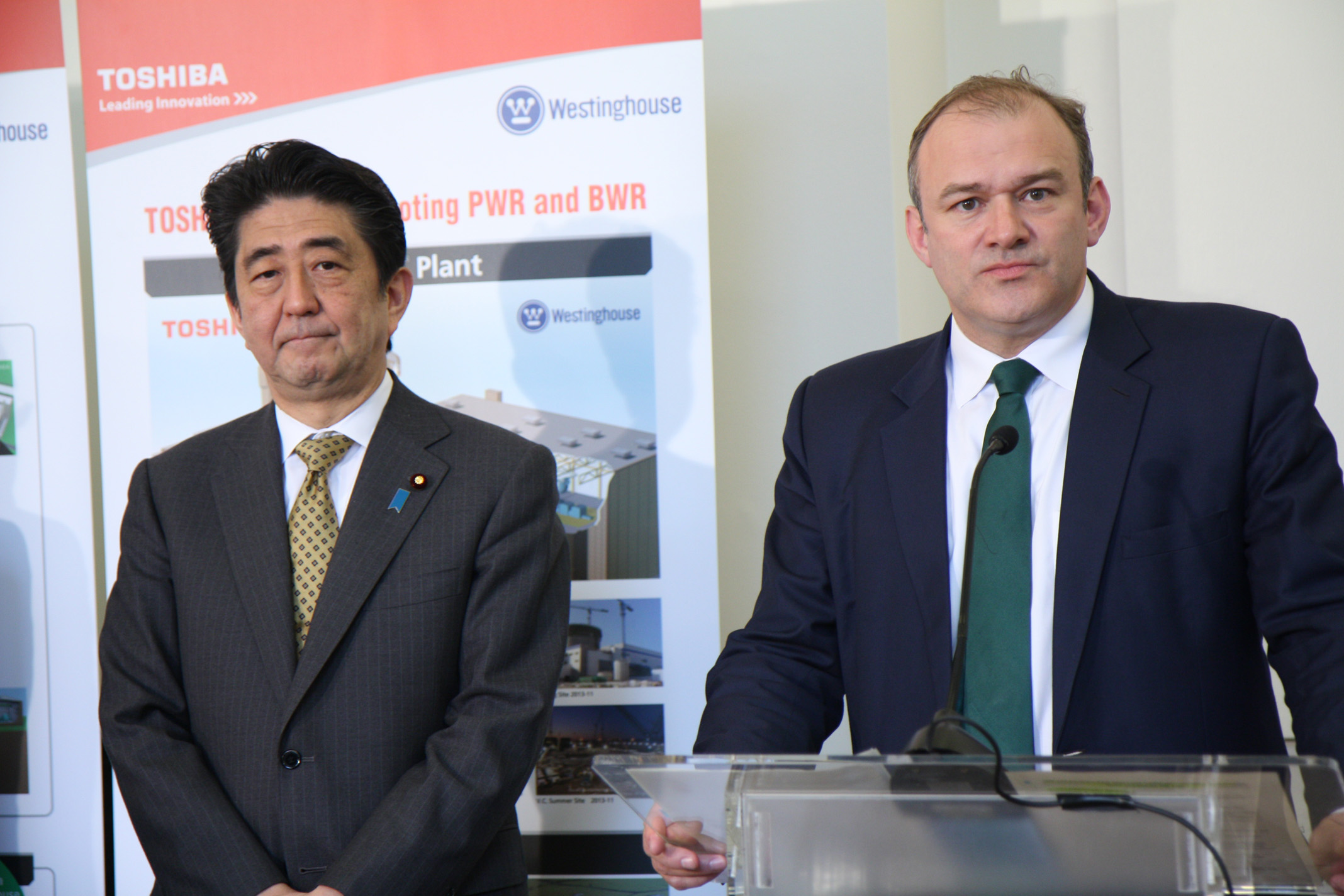
Davey as Energy Secretary (right) with Prime Minister of Japan Shinzō Abe, 2014

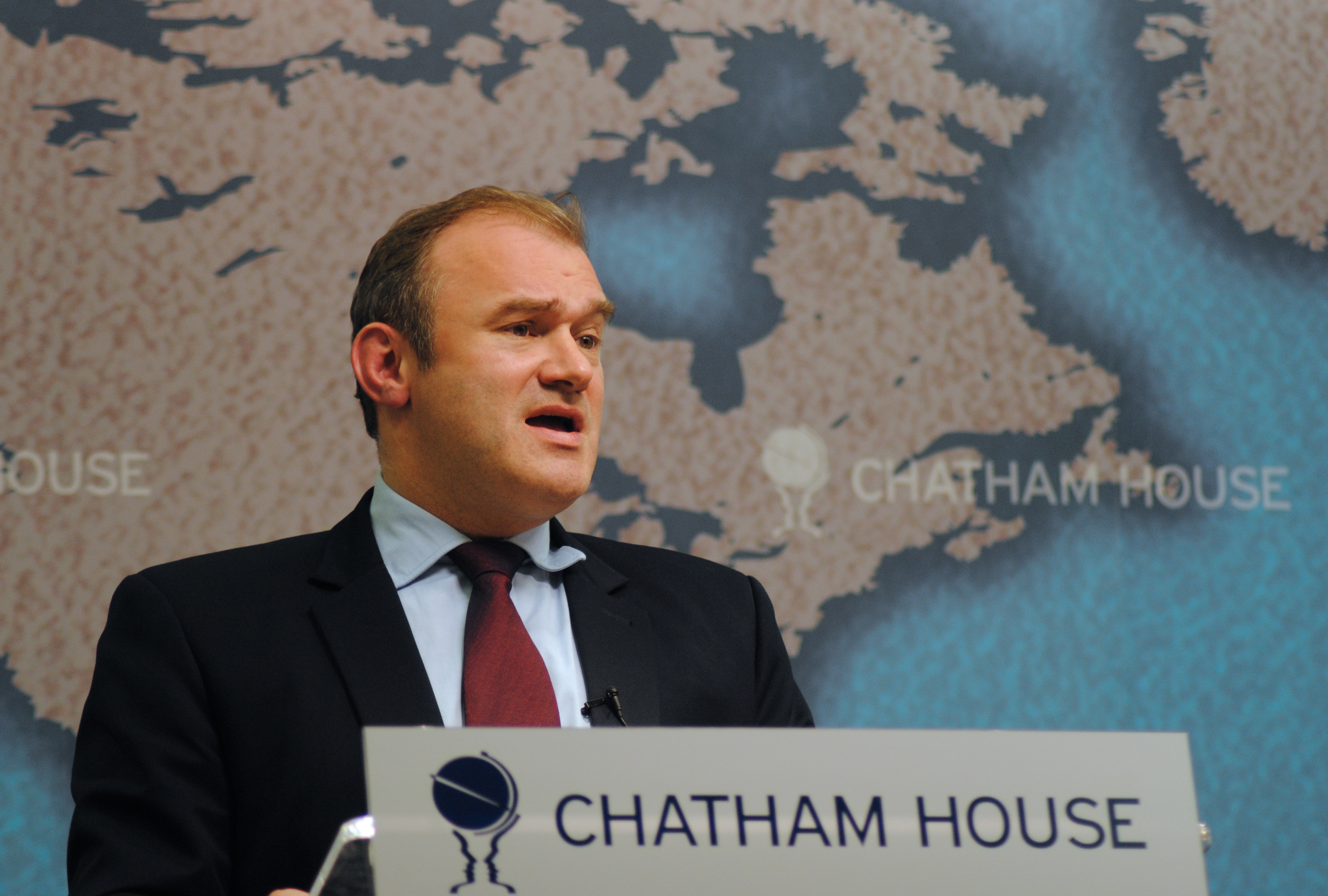
Davey at Chatham House, 2012

On 3 February 2012, following the resignation of Secretary of State for Energy and Climate Change Chris Huhne after his conviction of perverting the course of justice in relation to speeding offences, Davey was appointed Secretary of State for Energy and Climate Change, and was appointed to the Privy Council on 8 February. As Secretary of State, Davey also became a member of the National Security Council. In late 2012, the Daily Mail published an article questioning Davey's loyalty to Clegg. Responding in an interview, Davey rejected the claims of the article, saying instead he thought Clegg was "the best leader" the Liberal Democrats had ever had and that he personally was a member of Clegg's "Praetorian Guard".

In 2013, Davey set up the Green Growth Group, bringing together environmental and climate ministers from across the European Union in an effort to promote growth, investment in renewable and nuclear energy, liberalisation of the European energy market, a global carbon market, trade in energy, carbon capture technology, energy efficiency, and competition. Domestically, Davey focused on increasing competition in the energy market by removing barriers to entry for smaller companies, and streamlining the customer switching process, declaring in 2013 that "competition works". Abroad, Davey promoted investment in the British energy sector by foreign companies from countries such as Japan, South Korea, and China, making significant diplomatic trips to the latter two countries in order to highlight investment opportunities.

In October 2013, during a BBC Newsnight segment on energy bills, Davey was asked by BBC presenter Jeremy Paxman whether or not he wore a jumper (to stay warm) at home, to which Davey replied that he did but stressed that competition and energy efficiency were the solutions to lowering energy bills. The following day, various media outlets reported that Davey had advised for people to wear jumpers at home to save on energy bills, although he had not. The controversy then spread when Prime Minister David Cameron's official spokesman told a reporter that people may wish to "consider" advice by charities to wrap up warmly, leading to media outlets reporting that Number 10 was also suggesting wearing jumpers to cut energy bills, with the supposed suggestion being seized upon by the opposition Labour Party. Number 10 later issued a statement rebutting the media reports. In April 2014, Davey called for the G7 to begin reduction of dependency on Russian energy following the Revolution of Dignity and commencement of the Russo-Ukrainian War. Davey argued the benefits of investment in onshore wind energy from companies such as Siemens was a key part of the push to reduce dependence on Russian energy, while "more diversified supplies of gas" including from the US and domestic shale gas would also help. In May 2014 at a meeting in Rome, G7 energy ministers including Davey agreed formally to a process for reducing dependency on Russian energy; "Putin has crossed a line", Davey declared.

Throughout and after the coalition, Davey's ministerial career came under scrutiny from political figures and the media. On the right, Conservatives Nigel Lawson and Peter Lilley were critical of Davey's environmental stances, and he was lampooned by The Telegraph sketch writer Michael Deacon. He was also criticised by left-wing figures such as Green MP for Brighton Pavilion Caroline Lucas over his support of fracking, and by the Leader of the Opposition and Leader of the Labour Party Ed Miliband for Davey's warning that Labour's price control policy would cause blackouts. Luxembourgish MEP and environmentalist Claude Turmes alleged in his 2017 book Energy Transformation that Davey's Green Growth Group was actually a front for British nuclear interests. Conversely, Davey's promotion to the role of Energy Secretary was hailed by The Economist, which viewed him favourably as a "pragmatic" and "free market liberal". In "The Liberal Democrats and supply-side economics", published in an issue of the Institute of Economic Affairs' Economic Affairs journal, Davey was identified as the Liberal Democrat who had achieved the most in terms of supply-side reforms. Conservative MP and former Chancellor of the Duchy of Lancaster and Minister of State for Government Policy Oliver Letwin credited Davey and his "like-minded" group of economically liberal governments as having helped to curb regulatory enthusiasm within the European Union.

Leading up to the 2015 general election, Davey was viewed by various sources as a potential successor to Clegg. Political commentator Gary Gibbon speculated that due to Davey's association with the Orange Book wing of the party, the tenuousness of Danny Alexander's parliamentary seat, and David Laws' unwillingness, the role of "heir" would naturally fall to Davey.

== Parliamentary career (2017–present) ==
=== 2015 general election ===
At the 2015 general election, Davey was defeated by Conservative candidate James Berry by 2,834 votes after the Liberal Democrat vote fell by more than 15 per cent in Kingston and Surbiton. This made him the first cabinet minister to lose their seat since Michael Portillo in 1997.

Davey later told reporters he was "obviously disappointed" with his defeat, but said it had not been a total shock. "We knew it would be close – we had it written on our leaflets. But I don't think the voters did", he said. "When I was out canvassing today I had a man said to me: 'You'll be fine, Ed'. I wish I had a vote for all the people who told me I would be fine. The party is clearly paying some price for going into coalition with the Conservatives. We put the national interest above the party interest which was the right thing to do at the time. I have no regrets on that. I think we are seeing a national thing here. We have had a very bad night nationally."

At the end of 2015, he accepted a knighthood for 'political and public service' which was announced in the 2016 New Year Honours list.

=== Return to Parliament ===
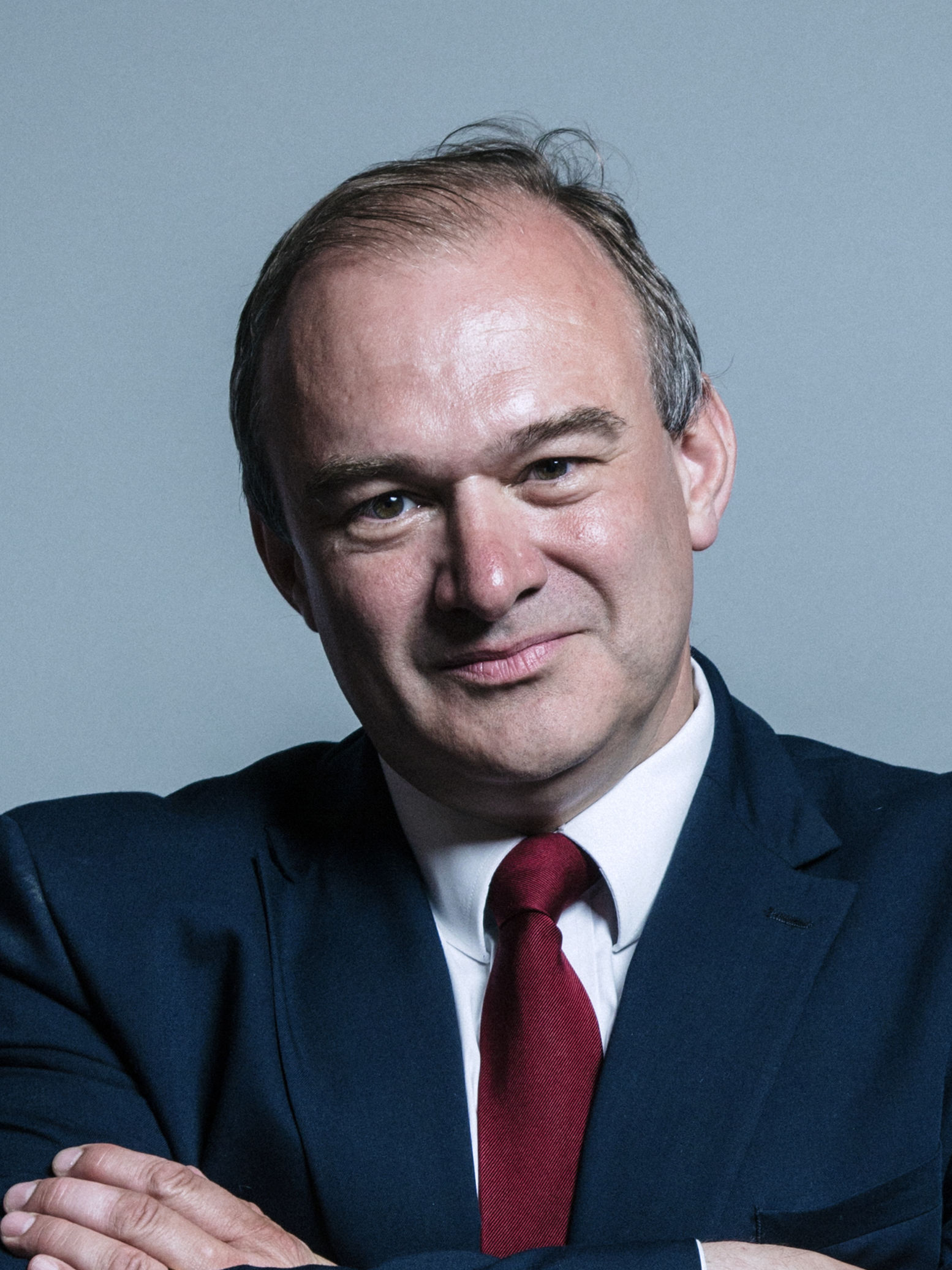
MP portrait, 2017

Davey regained Kingston and Surbiton for the Liberal Democrats at the 2017 general election, with a majority of 4,124 votes over Berry. Upon his return to Parliament, Davey was considered a possible candidate for the 2017 Liberal Democrat leadership election following the resignation of Tim Farron. However, he ruled out standing over family concerns, but called on the Liberal Democrats to be "the party of reform" and "super-ambitious – just like radical centrists in Canada, France and the Netherlands". Davey was then the Liberal Democrat Treasury spokesperson, having previously served as Liberal Democrat Home Affairs spokesperson from 2017 to 2019.

=== 2019 leadership bid and 2019 general election ===
Following the 2019 European Parliament election, Liberal Democrat leader Sir Vince Cable announced his intention "to hand over a bigger, stronger party" to a new leader, triggering a party leadership contest. Davey announced his candidacy for the role on 30 May, stating his belief that action must be taken in Parliament to prevent a "no deal" Brexit, and highlighting his support for stronger action to limit global warming. Davey lost this race to Jo Swinson, with 36.9% of the vote to Swinson's 63.1%. On 3 September 2019, Davey was elected as Swinson's deputy leader.

Davey was reelected in the 2019 general election, winning over 50% of the vote in Kingston and Surbiton for the first time since 2005. Following Jo Swinson's defeat at the 2019 general election, Davey served as joint acting leader of the Liberal Democrats, initially alongside Baroness Brinton and, from January 2020, alongside Mark Pack.

== Leader of the Liberal Democrats (2020–present) ==
=== 2020 leadership bid ===
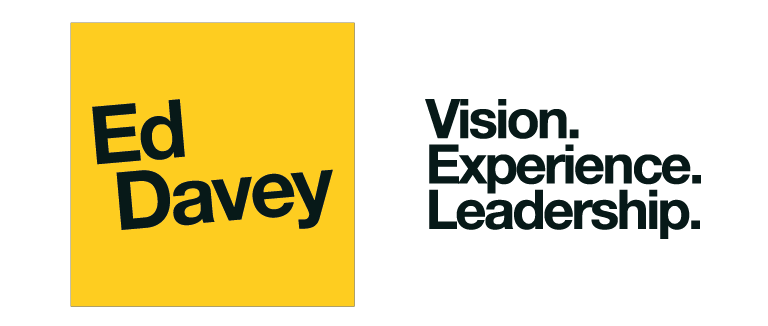
Davey's leadership bid logo

In June 2020, whilst acting leader, Davey launched his bid to become leader saying that his "experience as a carer can help rebuild Britain after the COVID-19 pandemic". He proposed the establishment of a basic income to support carers, and said that the Liberal Democrats should be "the party of social care". Davey ruled out a formal electoral agreement with the Labour Party, but said that he would prioritise defeating the Conservatives, and ruled out working with the Conservatives following the next election. He proposed a plan to reduce carbon emissions from domestic flights to zero by 2030 through investment in research and technology. In a hustings event with Welsh members, he said that the 2021 Senedd election was a priority and he expected success for the Liberal Democrats.

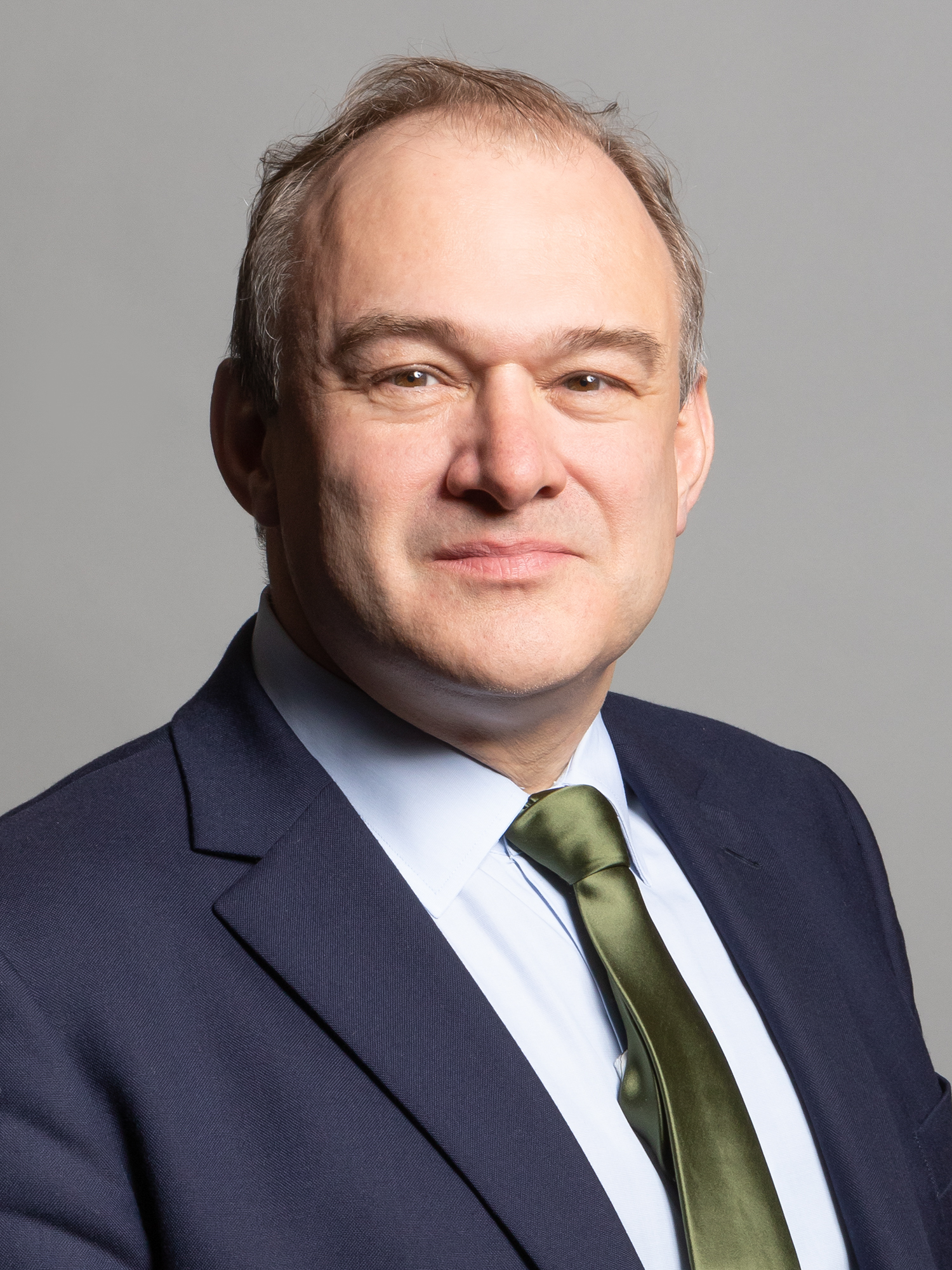
MP portrait, 2020

Davey was one of two candidates running for leader in the Liberal Democrats leadership election, competing with Layla Moran. One recurring theme of the leadership campaign was Davey's record in the Cameron-Clegg coalition government, and the policies that government had enacted. Moran is considered to be more left-wing than Davey and representing a break from the coalition years. Alongside Clegg and many of the Liberal Democrats who served in the governing Conservative-Lib Dem coalition of 2010–2015, Davey is associated with the party's right-wing Orange Booker branch. The record of the coalition, which caused a decline in popularity of the Liberal Democrats after 2015, has been defended by Davey.

On 27 August, Davey won the leadership election with 42,756 votes, which translated to 63.5% of total votes. In his victory speech, Davey said that the Liberal Democrats must "wake up and smell the coffee" and "start listening" to ordinary people and those who "don't believe we share their values". He also stressed his experience in the coalition government, and his commitments to tackle climate change. Moran later congratulated Davey on Twitter, saying "I look forward to working with him to campaign for a better future for Britain."

Under Davey's leadership, the Liberal Democrats made gains in local elections alongside Labour, with both parties making gains in the 2023 local elections and made further gains in the 2024 local elections, where the Liberal Democrats finished second for the first time in a local election cycle since 2009.

=== 2024 general election campaign stunts and seat victories ===
This general election is a chance to kick Rishi Sunak’s appalling Conservative government out of office and deliver the change the public is crying out for. For years the Conservative Party has taken voters for granted and lurched from crisis to crisis while the problems facing the country are getting so much worse. Every vote for the Liberal Democrats at this election is a vote for a strong local champion who will stand up for your community and health services. It’s clear that in many seats across the country, the best way to beat the Conservatives is to vote for the Liberal Democrats.

— Ed Davey after the general election was called, May 2024

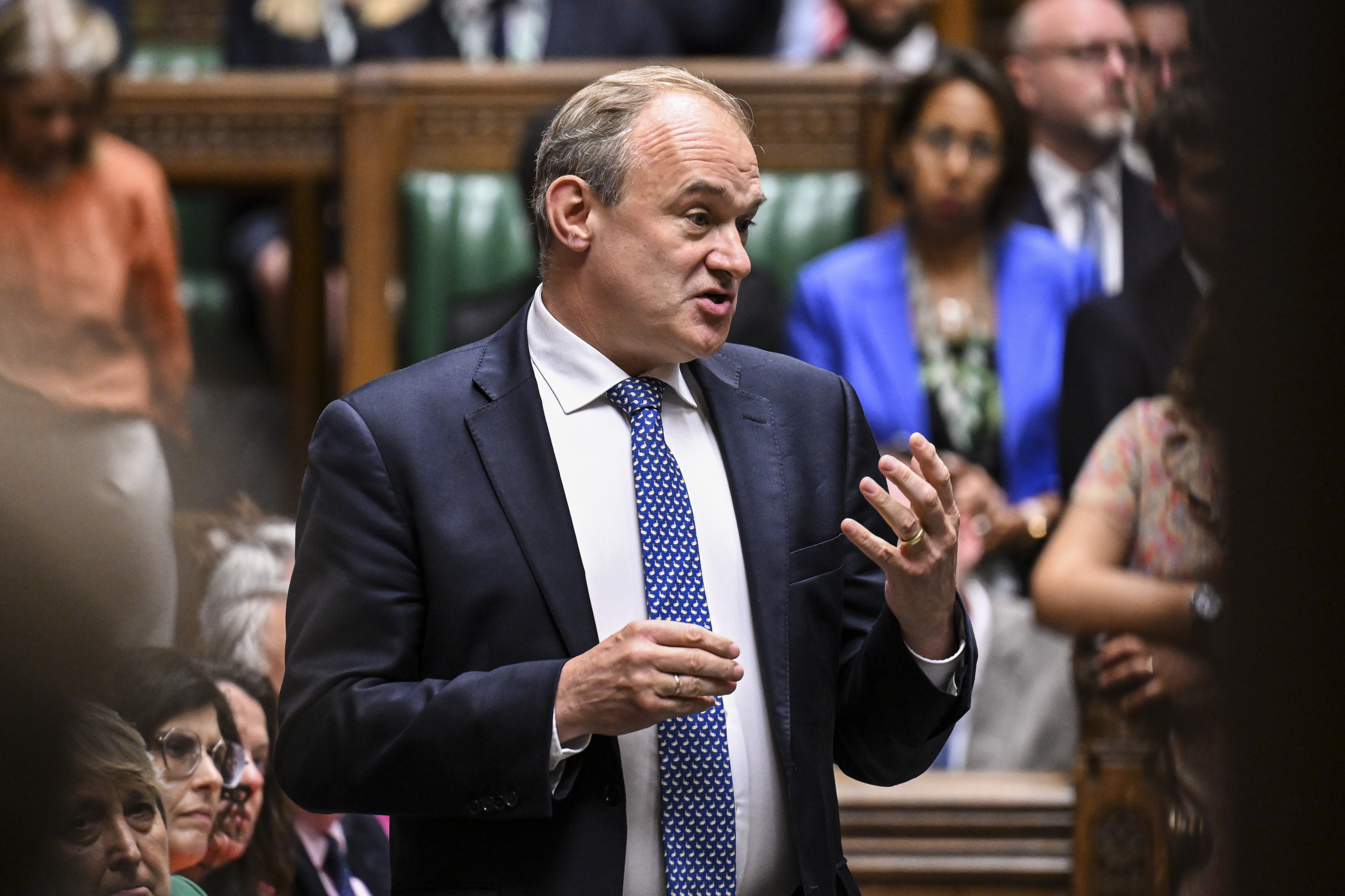
Davey speaking during Prime Minister's Questions, 24 July 2024

Davey led his party in the 2024 general election, and was noted, with praise and criticism, for his campaign stunts. When visiting Windermere, Davey fell off his paddleboard, whilst campaigning to highlight the political issue of sewage discharge in the United Kingdom. A couple of days later, Davey won high-profile media attention when going down a Slip 'N Slide, whilst drawing attention to deteriorating mental health among children. When visiting Eastbourne, Davey did a bungee jump, asking people to "take the plunge" and vote Liberal Democrat. When asked about these stunts, Davey said: "Politicians need to take the concerns and interests of voters seriously but I'm not sure they need to take themselves seriously all the time and I'm quite happy to have some fun".

Davey also spoke on his experience as a carer both for his mother when he was a child, and contemporarily for his son. This included an election broadcast focusing on his caring responsibilities, with Davey stating that the Liberal Democrat manifesto put health and care at the centre.

On 10 June 2024, Davey launched the Liberal Democrat manifesto, titled For a Fair Deal, in London. He stressed that the Lib Dems are a "pro-European party"; the manifesto includes a promise for the UK to rejoin the European single market. Midway through the campaign, opinion pollsters YouGov found that 35% of Liberal Democrat voters did not recognise a photograph of Davey. Amid the general election betting scandal, Davey, whilst admitting that he had previously bet on the outcome of elections, called for a review of gambling laws.

Davey led his party to both their highest ever number of seats and the highest number of seats for a third party since 1923, restoring the Liberal Democrats as the third largest party in the House of Commons. He celebrated by singing Neil Diamond's "Sweet Caroline" at a Liberal Democrat party. This also makes Davey able to ask two questions to the prime minister each week at Prime Minister's Questions, the first Liberal Democrat leader to do so since Nick Clegg in 2010. Davey said he was humbled by the results, and jokingly said: "I've rather enjoyed this campaign". He retained Kingston and Surbiton for the Liberal Democrats at the election, with an increased majority.

=== 2024 leadership bid ===
Another leadership election was held in December 2024 due to the requirement in the Liberal Democrats' party constitution that a leadership election should be held at least once during each Westminster parliament. Davey, the incumbent party leader under whom the Liberal Democrats had their best ever performance in the 2024 general election, was the only candidate and was elected unopposed.

=== 2025 local elections ===
Davey launched the Liberal Democrats' campaign in the 2025 local elections on 17 March 2025 in Great Missenden. On 20 March 2025 the party's spring conference began in Harrogate. Davey said he wants to replace the Conservatives as the "party of Middle England". Similar to his party's campaign in the 2024 general election the year prior, Davey did several campaign stunts. There were major gains for the Liberal Democrats who won three new councils and won more seats than the Conservatives for the second local election in a row. Davey celebrated these gains, stating his party was now the "party of Middle England".

== Political positions ==
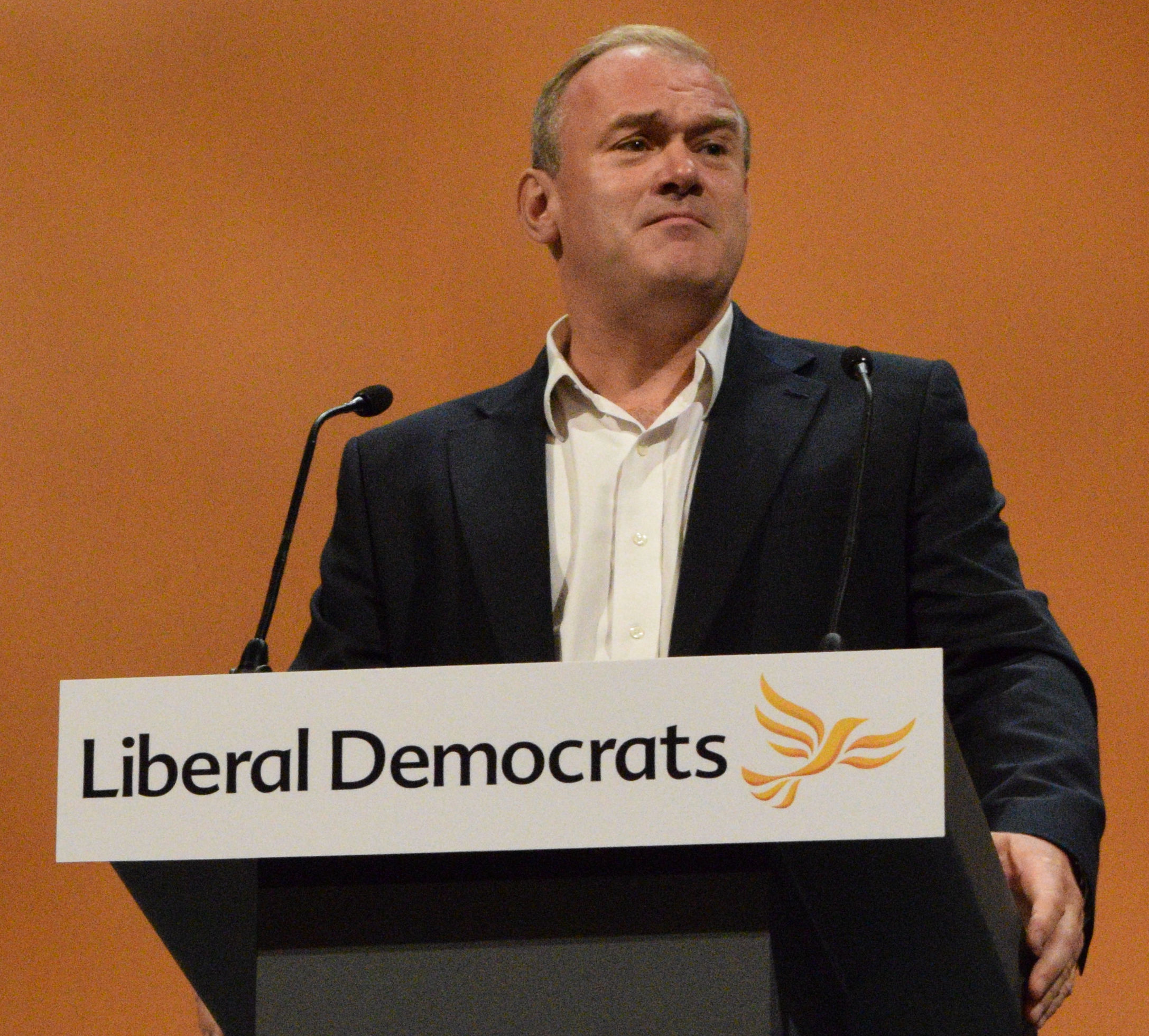
Davey addressing the 2017 Liberal Democrat Conference

Davey identifies as a liberal politically, telling the Total Politics magazine: "I personally think liberalism is the strongest political philosophy in the modern world. Socialism has failed. I think even social democracy, the watered down version which Labour sort of understand depending on which day of the week it is, is not very convincing, and I don't really understand where the Conservatives are coming from because they have so many philosophies within one party. There's no philosophy of the modern Conservative Party." He has said that he believes "in the free market and in competition", and during a parliamentary public bill committee debate in November 2010 argued in defence of privatisation, deregulation, and the private sector against Labour MP Gregg McClymont.

Davey describes himself as "an economist by trade." He was a supporter of the coalition government, writing in a 2011 column for London newspaper Get West London that the coalition would "restore liberty to the people" and that "Labour's nanny state will be cut back" in reference to the coalition's policies on civil liberties. In 2012, Davey predicted the coalition government would be more pro-European Union than Tony Blair's Labour government, praising Conservative ministers and the then Prime Minister David Cameron for relations they had developed with European counterparts. Retrospectively, Davey said of the coalition in 2017: "I think the coalition government, when history looks at it, will go down as actually a pretty good government."

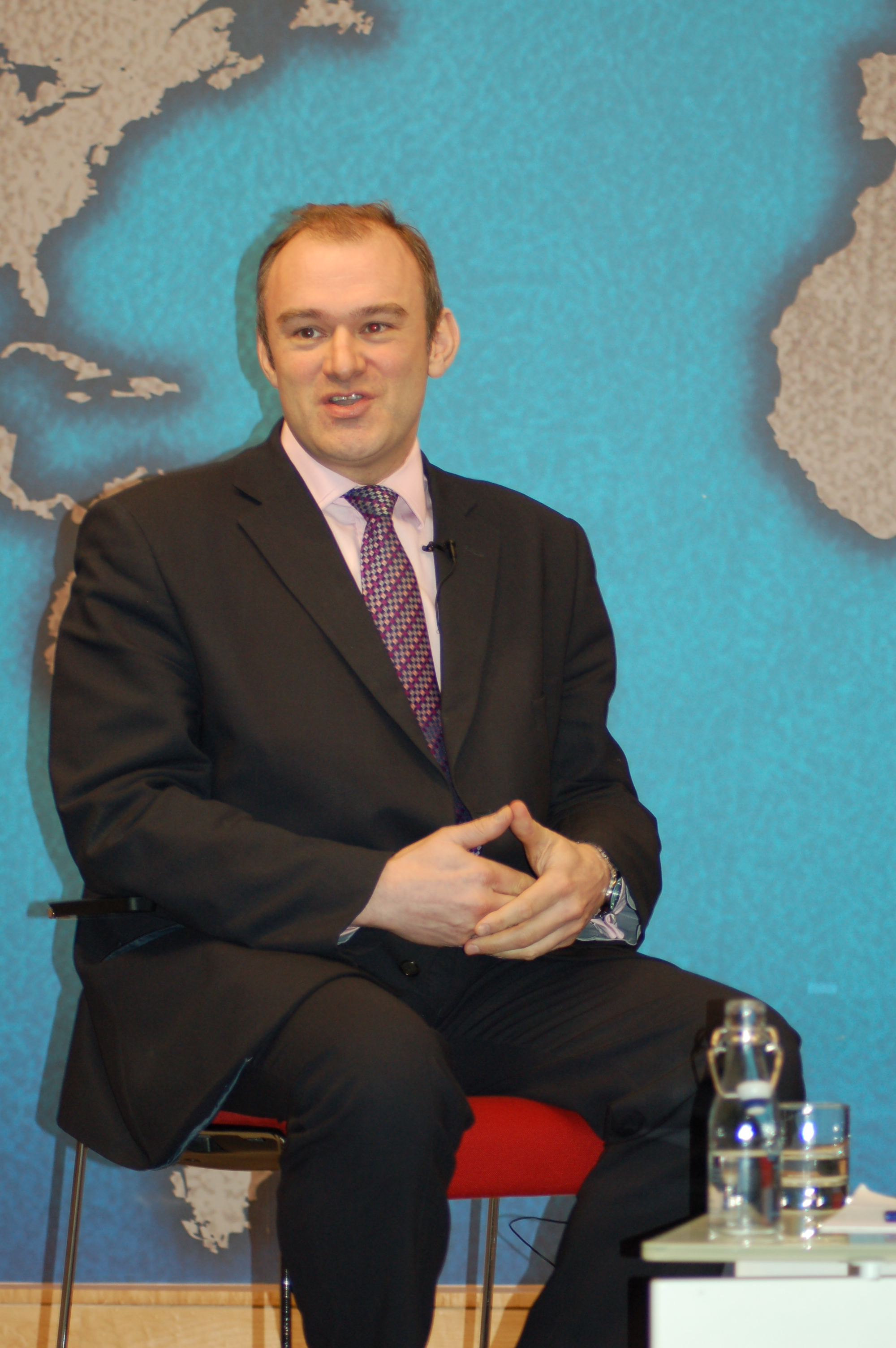
Davey in 2010

In 2017, Davey warned against a Conservative Party proposal for fines on large internet companies who fail to remove extremist and terrorist material from their platforms within 24 hours, which he claimed could lead to censorship if companies are forced to rush to remove such material and pointed to Germany as an example of where this approach has the potential to lead to censorship. He thinks technology giants must not be treated as the "enemy" and accused the Conservatives of declaring an "all-out war" on the internet. Similarly he is critical of Conservative proposals to weaken encryption because, according to Davey, encryption is important for individual security and helping businesses to thrive.

In 2018, after the government's Investigatory Powers Act mass surveillance law was declared to be in breach of EU law, Davey commented that UK surveillance needed a "major overhaul" which puts "our freedoms and civil liberties at its very core." Davey's party opposes the mass surveillance law and had voted against it.

Davey is supportive of market solutions in the conventional energy sector, The Guardian describing him as a 'zealot' for markets. He has been highly critical of price controls such as those proposed by former Labour leader Ed Miliband; he considers them to be detrimental to competition and lowering prices for consumers. He has promoted removal of barriers to entry to encourage new entrants into the energy market; "We began with deregulation. This stimulated a doubling of smaller firms" he wrote of his policy as Energy Secretary in 2014. Additionally, he welcomed the rise of consumer switching websites. He has, however, supported "properly designed and carefully targeted" short-term subsidies for some emerging green energy technologies in order to meet climate change targets.

When cutting green energy subsidies as Energy and Climate Change Secretary, Davey said he "tended to try and marketise the reduction so people were competing for any remaining subsidies" through Contracts for difference (CfDs). After leaving the office of Energy Secretary in 2015 he explained that he had planned to "eliminate subsidies over the coming years" and had previously stated, "ultimately I don't want the government—the Secretary of State—to decide what that low carbon mix is ... I want the markets and technology development and innovation to decide what that mix is."

He has argued in favour of both nuclear power and fracking as potential energy sources, and natural gases as transitional fuels, though he has warned that there should not be an over-reliance on them. Davey has previously argued against nuclear power but in 2013 he urged fellow Liberal Democrat members to support nuclear power, stating, "I've changed my mind because of climate change."

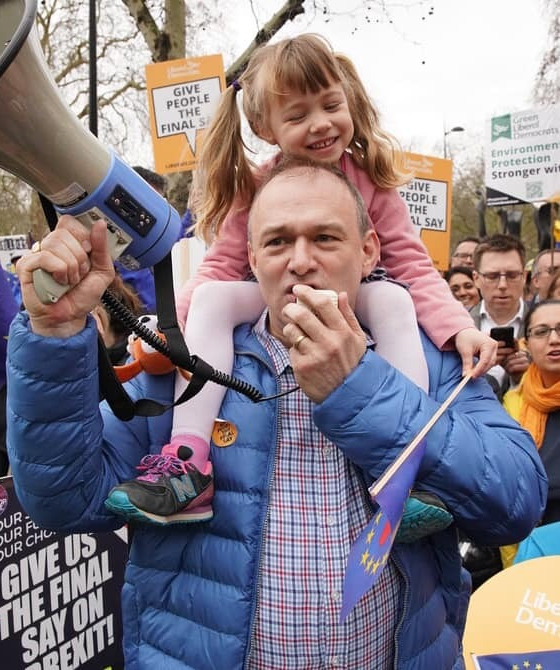
Davey at the People's Vote Rally 2019

Davey does not support the United Kingdom rejoining the European Union in the short term, in 2020 stating that the idea that people would want to consider re-joining the EU in two or three years' time as "being for the birds". In January 2021 he clarified this position, stating that he is "determined the Liberal Democrats remain a pro-European party committed to the UK being members of the European Union again", adding that his party is "practical" about the matter. Davey opposes a second Scottish independence referendum arguing in 2022, that it would be "damaging to recovery."

Following the murder of Sarah Everard in March 2021, Davey said that "men have got to change" and suggested that we "educate boys and men to show more respect". In May 2021, alongside celebrities and other public figures, Davey was a signatory to an open letter from Stylist magazine which called on the government to address what it described as an "epidemic of male violence" by funding an "ongoing, high-profile, expert-informed awareness campaign on men's violence against women and girls".

A supporter of transgender rights, Davey believes that transgender women should be given the same rights as cisgender women, which he made clear in a series of interviews on the day that a report into violence against women, commissioned in the wake of the Everard's murder, was published.

Davey criticised Boris Johnson after the 2021 North Shropshire by-election where a Lib Dem candidate, Helen Morgan overturned a Conservative majority of nearly 23,000 to win the seat. Davey said it was a "watershed moment in our politics. Millions of people are fed up with Boris Johnson and his failure to provide leadership throughout the pandemic and last night the voters of North Shropshire spoke for all of them."

Responding to Keir Starmer and Rachel Reeves' first budget in October 2024, Davey described the government's plans on social care as “a good start” but inadequate. He also said that he thought that the budget may not offer British people "a sense of hope, urgency and the promise of a fair deal" and that more could have been done to help the more vulnerable people in society. In October 2024, Davey said he was “very minded” to vote against the Terminally Ill Adults (End of Life) Bill to legalise assisted dying for terminally ill adults, saying the UK should “do much better” on palliative care.

Davey has used the scandal surrounding Peter Mandelson's relationship with sex offender Jeffrey Epstein to attack Starmer's judgment and call for greater transparency. Davey's criticism has focused on the handling of the appointment, the vetting process, and the impact on Epstein's victims. He described Mandelson's appointment as "another car crash" for the Labour government and questioned why Starmer proceeded with the appointment despite Mandelson's well-known history. After Mandelson's sacking, Davey demanded that Starmer "come before Parliament and explain" his decision-making process. In a parliamentary debate, Davey agreed with a Labour MP's argument that professional diplomats should be appointed as ambassadors instead of politicians. The Liberal Democrats have called for an independent investigation into what was known about Mandelson's links to Epstein at the time of his appointment. Deputy Leader Daisy Cooper called for a full review of vetting procedures, stating it was "extraordinary" that Mandelson could have been appointed without the Prime Minister knowing all the facts. Like the Conservative leader Kemi Badenoch, Davey called on Starmer to apologise directly to Epstein's victims for appointing Mandelson. He asked how it must have felt for victims to see "another of Epstein's closest friends" made a British ambassador. Davey also voiced concern about the timing of the scandal, just before a state visit by Trump, who also had connections to Epstein. Davey urged Starmer to question Trump about his relationship with Epstein during their meeting.

=== Foreign affairs ===
Since the 2000s, Davey has been vocal on the issue of detention without trial, in particular Guantanamo and Bagram, which he believed required transparency and formal investigation of torture allegations. He has opposed indefinite detention for illegal immigrants.

Davey has been in support of trade to import natural gas from countries including the United States and Qatar, and importation of green energy via new interconnectors from Norway and Ireland. Davey describes himself as a "strong free-trader", rejecting reciprocity in trade tariffs as "the classic protectionist argument". He believes Britain should be open to foreign investment, except for investment tainted by "smells that you have from Putin." He dismisses worries over foreign ownership and investment in the British economy such as that of French and Chinese companies' involvement in the British energy market.

In November 2023, Davey expressed support for a ceasefire in the Gaza Strip following the Gaza war, saying that "it is increasingly clear that a military solution to eliminate Hamas is not possible. With a devastating humanitarian catastrophe in Gaza, an ongoing hostage situation, and growing risk of regional escalation, we must urgently demand a different approach." In September 2025, Davey accused Israel of committing a genocide in the Gaza Strip.

Following the attempted assassination of Donald Trump in Pennsylvania, Davey said "Political violence is wrong... We must all condemn this appalling attempt on Donald Trump's life." After Trump won the 2024 United States presidential election, Davey said it was a "dark, dark day for people around the globe" and said Trump was a "dangerous, destructive demagogue" who "actively undermines the rule of law, human rights, international trade, climate action and global security." Davey argued that Trump should only receive the ceremony of a British state visit if he supported Ukraine, and proposed that Trump's tariffs be used as a point from which to negotiate membership of the EU's customs union.

Davey boycotted the banquet at Windsor Castle during the 2025 state visit by Donald Trump to the United Kingdom in protest at Trump's policies toward the Gaza Strip and the ongoing humanitarian crisis there. Davey said that Trump "has the power to stop the horrifying starvation and death in Gaza and get the hostages released" due to his influence over Israel, Qatar and the Gulf states.

== Other ventures ==
=== Business appointments ===
Davey took up several business appointments after leaving his role as Secretary of State for Energy and Climate Change in May 2015.

Mongoose Energy appointed Davey as chairman in September 2015.

Davey set up an independent consultancy in September 2015 to provide advice on energy and climate change.

In January 2016 Davey was appointed as a part-time consultant to MHP Communications, the public relations and lobbying firm representing EDF Energy. Davey was criticised by press commentators for the potential conflict of interest between his previous role as Secretary of State for Energy and Climate Change and his role at MHP. As Secretary of State Davey awarded EDF the contract to build a new nuclear plant at Hinkley Point in Somerset.

Davey's appointment as Global Partner and non-Executive director of private equity investor Nord Engine Capital was announced in February 2016.

In July 2016 he became non-paid patron of the Sustainable Futures Foundation, a charity promoting environmental sustainability for the public benefit.

Until February 2021, Davey was on the advisory boards of the law firm Herbert Smith Freehills and of the fund manager NextEnergy Capital, which manages the listed company NextEnergy Solar Fund; he resigned both roles in the wake of the parliamentary second jobs controversy.

Davey is the Chair of the All-Party Britain-Republic of Korea Parliamentary Group (APPG). He is also the Chair of the APPG on Charity Retail, the Vice Chair of the APPG for the Ahmadiyya Muslim Community, and the Vice Chair of the APPG on Land Value Capture.

=== Christmas charity single ===
On 28 November 2024, Davey released the Christmas charity single "Love is Enough" featuring the Bath Philharmonia choir. The song is "a tribute to the caring responsibilities of young carers and the bond they share with the people they care for." His decision to do a Christmas song was inspired by his time as a chorister when he was a teenager. All money raised from downloads and streams of the song went to the Carers Trust and Bath Philarmonia.

Davey said of the song: “I hope people listen to this song and download it and are as impressed as I am by the amazing talent of these young carers. I hope people take some time this Christmas to think about this amazing group of people who look after their loved ones from such an early age. This time of year is tough for all carers, particularly young ones – let's put them in the spotlight.”

=== Book ===
Davey's autobiography, Why I Care: And why care matters, was released by HarperCollins on 22 May 2025. The book is described as "a deeply personal account of life as a carer and a call to support those who care for others."

== Personal life ==
In the summer of 2005, Davey married Emily Gasson, the Liberal Democrat candidate for North Dorset at the that year's general election. They have a son named John (born December 2007) and a daughter named Ellie. John has severe learning and physical disabilities due to an undiagnosed neurological condition and requires round-the-clock care, which is provided by Davey and Gasson as well as external carers, and is a key reason behind Davey's advocacy for carers. John also has speech difficulties, spurring Davey's interest in speech therapy. The family lives in Surbiton, where Davey also lived before his election to Parliament in 1997.

Davey is a Christian, who has stated that his faith has an impact on his politics. He attends his local Anglican parish church and has written, "I would place my belief as somewhere between the non-Conformist traditions and the liberal wing of the Church of England."

In addition to his native English, Davey speaks French, German, and Spanish. He is a supporter of Notts County FC.

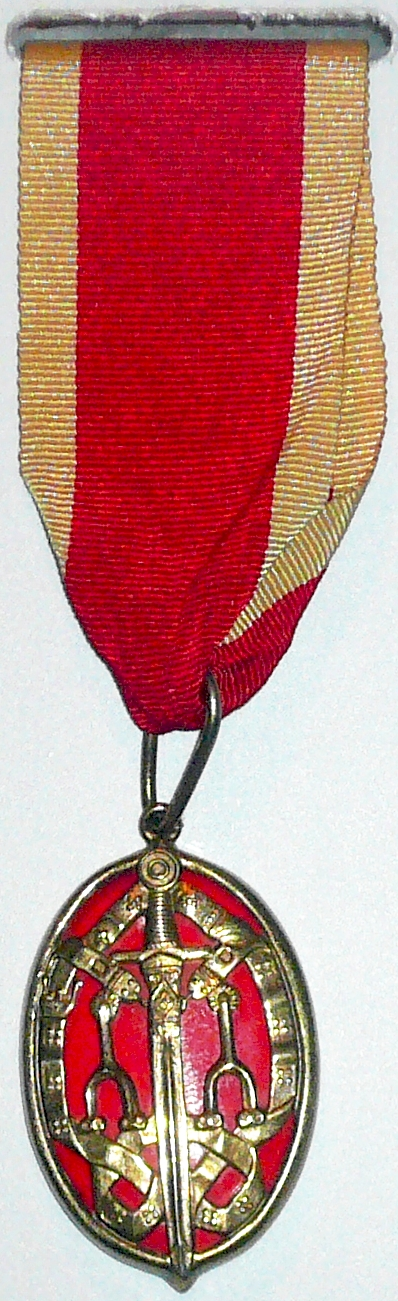
Knight Bachelor insignia

== Honours ==
In 1995, Davey won a Royal Humane Society bravery award and commendation from the Chief constable of the British Transport Police for rescuing a woman who had fallen onto the railway line in the face of an oncoming train at Clapham Junction railway station.

In 2001 he was elected a Fellow of the Royal Society of Arts (FRSA).

He was sworn in as a member of Her Majesty's Most Honourable Privy Council on 8 February 2012, giving him the honorific prefix "The Right Honourable" for life.

Davey was knighted in the 2016 New Years Honours List for 'political and public service', enabling him to wear the Knight Bachelor neck decoration on occasions such as Remembrance Sunday.

== Publications ==
- Davey, Edward (2000), Making MPs Work For Our Money: Reforming Parliament's Role In Budget Scrutiny by 2000, Centre for Reform, ISBN 1-902622-21-9
- Davey, Edward. "Liberalism and localism", Chapter 2 in The Orange Book: Reclaiming Liberalism by David Laws and Paul Marshall (contributions et al.), 2004, Profile Books, ISBN 1-86197-797-2
- Davey, Edward; Hunter, Rebecca. People Who Help Us: Member of Parliament, 2004, Cherrytree Books, ISBN 978-1842345467

== See also ==
- Liberal Democrat frontbench team

== Notes ==
Parliament of the United Kingdom
New constituency	Member of Parliament for Kingston and Surbiton; 1997–2015	Succeeded by James Berry
Preceded by James Berry	Member of Parliament for Kingston and Surbiton; 2017–present	Incumbent
Political offices
Preceded by The Lord Young of Norwood Green	Undersecretary of State for Employment Relations, Consumer and Postal Affairs; 2010–2012	Succeeded by Norman Lamb
Preceded by Chris Huhne	Secretary of State for Energy and Climate Change; 2012–2015	Succeeded by Amber Rudd
Party political offices
Preceded by Jo Swinson	Deputy Leader of the Liberal Democrats; 2019–2020	Succeeded by Daisy Cooper
Preceded by Jo Swinson	Leader of the Liberal Democrats; 2020–present	Incumbent
