= Customer success =

Business strategy

Customer success is a business marketing strategy and organizational function focused on ensuring customers achieve their desired outcomes while using a company's products or services. The goal is to increase customer perception of value to reduce loss of customers, typically called "churn" in this field. Customer success practices are used by business-to-business companies with subscription business models, such as companies that sell software as a service (SaaS), because ongoing customer satisfaction directly impacts recurring revenue, and traditional customer service and customer support may not be sufficient to retain customers over time. Companies such as Salesforce developed customer success strategies in the mid-2000s to increase revenue by improving customer retention.

The concept of customer success builds on the earlier models of services marketing and relationship marketing. It is related to the marketing and strategic management practices of customer relationship management, customer experience design, and customer engagement.

Companies may establish customer success departments and hire customer success managers to build and maintain relationships with customer companies. A customer success manager may serve as a point of contact with a client company after a salesperson has sold the customer a solution, helping the customer adopt the product into their business processes.

== See also ==
- Concepts:
  - Customer lifetime value
  - Enterprise application integration
  - Voice of the customer
- Roles:
  - Chief customer officer
  - Customer engineer
  - Forward deployed engineer
  - Sales engineering
  - Systems integrator
