= Application development =

Application development may refer to:

- Mobile application development ("app development")
- The process of developing application software in general
- Overlapping aspects of industrial research and development and sales engineering, in which commercial applications of technology are developed

== See also ==
- Software development
- Android Application Development, see Android (operating system)
