= VXT =

VXT (pronounced "vext") is a New Zealand Voice over IP (VoIP) company founded in 2018 to transcribe voicemail to text. The transcription service was discontinued in 2025 and the company now focuses on VoIP software for businesses.

== History ==
VXT was founded in the summer of 2018/2019 and was launched in October 2019 by University of Canterbury students Luke Campbell and Lucy Turner. VXT participated in the university's summer startup programme which lasted for 10 weeks. They joined the Google Cloud Platform for Startups, covering up to $150,000 in Google costs and were awarded the equivalent of $19,000 at the university's Entré’s 85k Challenge. Starting in December 2019 they participated in Vodafone's Xone startup accelerator programme.

The company originally provided a service named VXT Voicemail that transcribed voicemail to text. When a user missed a call, the voicemail was recorded on VXT servers, transcribed to text using a Google speech recognition product, and then that text was sent to the user, either by text or email. In November 2019 users could use the transcription service for free for up to 15 voicemails a month, but for up to 80 transcriptions they had to pay $5.99 per month, and for $20 a month could receive an unlimited number of transcribed voicemails.

In March 2021 the company began offering the phone call recording and transcription service VXT Call, aimed at people who work in the fields of law and recruitment. VXT began focussing on the call service as it was receiving 50–100 times more income per customer than VXT Voicemail. In 2024 VXT announced that it would discontinue VXT Voicemail in 2025 after pivoting from a business-to-consumer (B2C) voicemail transcription company to a business-to-business (B2B) Voice over IP phone system.

In September 2020 VXT raised $600,000. In July 2021 VXT Voicemail had 10,000 users across five countries and the company had six full-time employees. As of February 2024 the annual recurring revenue is $1.3 million and over 200 legal firms use VXT. In April 2024 the company raised $1.8 million in a pre-series A funding round, led by the Auckland-based venture capital firm GD1. In early 2025 VXT raised $2.5 million, valuing the company at $45 million.

== Awards ==
In 2021 Campbell was a finalist for the Momentum Student Entrepreneur award. In 2025 Campbell and Turner were listed in the annual Forbes 30 Under 30 list for Asia in the AI category. In 2025 he was a finalist for EY New Zealand's Entrepreneur of the Year.
