= NextEnergy Solar Fund =

British investment company

NextEnergy Solar Fund Ltd
- Company type: Public company
- Traded as: LSE: NESF
- Industry: Renewable energy
- Headquarters: Saint Peter Port, Guernsey
- Key people: Kevin Lyon (Chairman)
- Products: Investment company
- Website: nextenergysolarfund.com

NextEnergy Solar Fund (LSE: NESF) is a large British investment company dedicated to investments in the operation of solar photovoltaic assets located in the UK and Italy. It is listed on the London Stock Exchange.

== History ==
The company was established in 2014.

In January 2021, the company indicated its intention to diversify into green energy investments in Italy, Portugal and the US.

In February 2021, during the United Kingdom parliamentary second jobs controversy, the Leader of the Liberal Democrats, Sir Ed Davey, apologised to the UK Parliament after failing to declare his advisory role at the company's manager, NextEnergy Capital, when asking questions in parliament. He later resigned his role at NextEnergy.

The chairman is Kevin Lyon.
