= CE =

CE, Ce, ce, Će, or variants may refer to:

== Business ==
- CE marking (stylized ), a mandatory administrative marking asserting conformity with relevant standards, applied to certain products offered for sale within the European Economic Area
- CE Digital, an operator of DAB ensembles in the United Kingdom
- Customer equity, the total combined customer lifetime values of all of the company's customers
- Combustion Engineering, a former American manufacturer of power systems
- Nationwide Airlines (South Africa) (IATA airline designator CE)

== Calendar ==
- Common Era (abbreviated CE), an alternative term to Anno Domini (AD)

== Education ==
- College English, an official publication of the American National Council of Teachers of English
- Common Entrance Examination, tests used by independent schools in the UK
- Conductive education, an educational system developed for people with motor disorders
- Continuing education, a broad spectrum of post-secondary learning activities and programs
- Chartered engineer (UK), a professional engineer licensed by a professional body (modern abbreviation CEng)
- Hong Kong Certificate of Education Examination, a standardized examination from 1974 to 2011

== Entertainment ==
- cê, a 2006 music album by Caetano Veloso
- Chaotic Evil, an alignment in the tabletop game Dungeons and Dragons
- Collector's edition, describing some special editions of software, movies, and books
- Cash Explosion, Ohio Lottery's scratch off game and weekly game show
- Halo: Combat Evolved, sometimes abbreviated as Halo: CE

== Job titles ==
- Chief executive, administrative head of some regions
- County executive, the head of the executive branch of county government, common in the US
- Construction electrician (United States Navy), a Seabee occupational rating
- Customer engineer, a technical support worker

== Languages ==
- Canadian English
- Chechen language (ISO 639-1 language code: ce)
- Commonwealth English
- Tshe, a letter of the Cyrillic script also transcribed as Će
- Tse (Cyrillic), a letter of the Cyrillic script also transcribed as Ce

== Organizations ==
- Church of England, the state church of the U.K. and mother church of the Anglican Communion, also referred to as the C of E
- Command element (United States Marine Corps), headquarters component of U.S. Marine Corps Marine Air-Ground Task Force (MAGTF)
- European Community (French: Communauté Européenne, Italian: Comunità Europea, Portuguese: Comunidade Europeia, Romanian: Comunitatea Europeană, Spanish: Comunidad Europea)

== Places ==
- Cé (Pictish territory), an early medieval Pictish territory in modern-day Scotland
- Province of Caserta (ISO 3166-2:IT code CE), a province of Italy
- County Clare, Ireland (vehicle registration plate code CE)
- Ceará (ISO 3166-2:BR code CE), a state in Brazil
- Ceper railway station, a railway station in Indonesia (station code)
- Lough Key, known in Irish as Loch Cé
- Sri Lanka (FIPS Pub 10-4 and obsolete NATO country code CE)

== Science and technology ==
=== Computing ===
- Cheat Engine, a system debugger and cheating tool
- Clear Entry, a button on a standard electronic calculator that clears the last number entered
- Computably enumerable, a property of some sets in computability theory, abbreviated c.e.
- Computer engineering, a branch of engineering specialized in computer hardware
- Congestion Experienced, a protocol element of the Explicit Congestion Notification data networking protocol
- Customer edge router, a router at the customer premises that is connected to a Multi-protocol Label Switching network
- Windows CE, "Consumer Edition", a version of the Windows operating system designed for mobile devices
- TI-84 Plus CE, "Color Enhancement", a version of the TI-84 Plus Graphing Calculator with a high-resolution color display

=== Other uses in science and technology ===
- Capillary electrophoresis, a technique used to separate ionic species by their charge and frictional forces
- CE phase, the phase between carrier and envelope of an electromagnetic wave
- Cerium, symbol Ce, a chemical element
- Cholesteryl ester
- Civil engineering
- Common envelope, gas containing a binary system.
- Conjugated estrogen
- Consumer electronics
- Customer engineer
- Cè, a Chinese star name which can refer to either:
  - Gamma Cassiopeiae
  - Kappa Cassiopeiae

== Other uses ==
- Copy editing, improving the formatting, style, and accuracy of text

== See also ==
- Œ (OE ligature)
- ₠ (U-20A0, European Currency Unit) (former)
