= Blitzy =

American artificial intelligence company

- Type: Private
- Industry: Artificial intelligence, Enterprise software
- Founded: November 2023; 2 years ago in Cambridge, Massachusetts, U.S.
- Founders: Brian Elliott; Sid Pardeshi
- Headquarters: Cambridge, Massachusetts, U.S.
- Area served: Worldwide
- Key people: Brian Elliott (CEO); Sid Pardeshi (CTO)
- Products: Autonomous software development platform
- Number of employees: ~100 (2026)
- Website: blitzy.com

Blitzy is an American artificial intelligence company headquartered in Cambridge, Massachusetts, that develops an autonomous software development platform for large enterprises. The company's software reverse-engineers an organization's existing codebase into a knowledge graph and coordinates large numbers of AI agents to modernize legacy software and build new applications, with a human engineer approving and completing the final portion of the work.

Blitzy was founded in 2023 by Brian Elliott and Sid Pardeshi, who met while studying at Harvard University. In May 2026, the company raised $200 million at a $1.4 billion valuation in a round led by Northzone, making it one of the Boston area's newest unicorns.

== History ==
Blitzy was founded in November 2023 by Brian Elliott and Sid Pardeshi, then graduate students at Harvard Business School, and was started at the university's Harvard Innovation Lab. Prior to Blitzy, in 2020, founder and CEO Brian Elliott had launched a startup offering AI-based therapy. According to Forbes, the idea originated when the two founders took on a consulting project for a Boston bakery that wanted a customer-ordering app; rather than the six months the owners expected, the pair built the application in a single weekend by combining multiple AI models, which prompted them to start the company.

Elliott, the company's chief executive, is a serial entrepreneur and former U.S. Army Ranger who studied systems engineering at the United States Military Academy (West Point) and earned an MBA at Harvard; he had previously founded a company called Wove. Pardeshi, the chief technology officer, spent more than seven years at Nvidia, where he was named a "Master Inventor," and holds more than 27 patents related to neural networks, image generation, and AI-driven interface translation before pursuing a dual master's degree in business and engineering at Harvard.

The company raised a $4.4 million seed/Series A round in September 2024. Over the following two years, it developed its platform and, according to the company, was adopted by dozens of Global 2000 enterprises. In May 2026, Blitzy announced a $200 million growth round at a $1.4 billion valuation, bringing its total funding to more than $204 million. The company said it had more than doubled its headcount in the preceding six months and operated a second office in Pune, India.

== Technology ==
Blitzy markets what it calls an autonomous software development platform aimed at enterprises with large legacy codebases. The company argues that frontier language models alone cannot reliably produce production-ready code at enterprise scale, and that additional inference-time computation and a persistent understanding of a codebase are required.

Rather than functioning as an in-editor coding assistant, the platform first reverse-engineers an organization's existing software environment and builds a dynamic knowledge graph of the codebase, mapping dependencies between components. An orchestration layer the company calls "Blitzy OS" then coordinates thousands of AI agents in parallel for extended periods—described as days to weeks of continuous inference—to plan, write, test, and update code. Blitzy does not train its own foundation models; instead it combines third-party models such as Gemini, GPT, and Claude. The company states that its platform can process codebases ranging from one million to more than 100 million lines of code, autonomously completes roughly 80% of a project while leaving the remaining work to human engineers, and has produced up to fivefold increases in engineering velocity for some customers. Blitzy has said its platform achieved a score of 66.5% on the SWE-Bench Pro benchmark.

According to Forbes, Blitzy's enterprise packages start at between $1 million and $10 million per year, with pricing based on roughly 20 cents per line of code.

== Customers ==
Blitzy has said its platform is used by dozens of Global 2000 enterprises across about ten industries, with a focus on regulated sectors such as financial services, insurance, and government. Named customers reported in the press include State Street, QAD, Builders FirstSource, and the Mexican insurer Grupo Nacional Provincial.

== Funding ==
Funding rounds
Date	Round	Amount	Lead investor
September 2024	Pre-Seed	$4.4 million	—
May 2026	Growth	$200 million	Northzone

The 2026 round included new investors PSG, Battery Ventures, Jump Capital, Morgan Creek Digital, and Defiant; existing investors Flybridge Capital, Link Ventures, NFX, Picus Capital, and Venture Guides; and strategic investors including Liberty Mutual Strategic Ventures, Erie Strategic Ventures, and BAL Ventures. The round valued the company at $1.4 billion.

== Reception ==
Blitzy operates in the enterprise segment of the AI coding market alongside companies such as Anysphere (maker of Cursor), Cognition (maker of Devin), and Factory, as well as general-purpose tools such as Claude Code and Codex. Jeff Bussgang, a Harvard Business School senior lecturer and Flybridge investor who taught the founders and later backed the company, described Blitzy's target market of large, complex legacy codebases as "a huge market, truly massive." Blitzy is the subject of a 2026 Harvard Business School case study on scaling its sales, services, and forward-deployed engineer functions. The Boston Globe situated the company within broader investor concern about AI tools that modernize legacy enterprise software.

== See also ==
- List of unicorn startup companies
