= Enterprise Sri Lanka =

Enterprise Sri Lanka was a loan scheme which was implemented to give relief to small and medium scale enterprises in Sri Lanka.

== History ==
In June 2018, the Enterprise Sri Lanka was initiated as a loan portfolio during the Maithripala Sirisena-Ranil Wickremasinghe led coalition government (famously dubbed as Yahapalanaya government), which came into power after winning the 2015 Sri Lankan presidential election. The purpose of the loan scheme was to encourage the local production, regional development and to boost the revenue streams of the small and medium businesses in Sri Lanka, especially with the aim of withstanding foreign competitors and to elevate import substitution strategies in order to expand the Gross Domestic Product and economic growth of Sri Lanka. The Yahapalanaya government launched the Enterprise Sri Lanka loan package as a part of its Vision 2025 strategies, as promised by the government in its election manifesto. The weight of expectations also revolved around the importance on uplifting the spirits of the aspiring entrepreneurs by providing them fair and equal opportunities under the Enterprise Sri Lanka initiative.

The Enterprise Sri Lanka initiative was taken over by the Ministry of Finance who oversaw the proceedings regarding the handling of the granting of loan moratorium relief packages to assist the SME sector. At least 16 concessionary loans including 11 interest subsidy loan schemes and three refinancing loan schemes were proposed under the Enterprise Sri Lanka initiative. The Sri Lankan government announced the plans of disbursing approximately LKR 60 billion through licensed state banks and licensed commercial private banks to expedite the procedure regarding the Enterprise Sri Lanka initiative. In 2019, the Ministry of Finance issued circulars notifying about the precautionary guidelines to be followed in order to stay alerted and vigilant about the scams caused by the perpetrators pertaining to the loan applications under the Enterprise Sri Lanka initiative. Ministry of Finance insisted that a fraudulent attempt was carried out by exploiting the Ministry of Finance's letterhead to send letters to the applicants of Enterprise Sri Lanka loan package.

The Enterprise Sri Lanka initiative was eventually abandoned by the Gotabaya Rajapaksa led government which came into power after winning the 2019 Sri Lankan presidential election. In June 2024, the Ranil Wickremasinghe led government made attempts to revive the Enterprise Sri Lanka scheme by reaching a consensus to establish a new consolidated agency under the same name for the monitoring, supervision and development of the small and medium scale businesses which were severely impacted by the effect of the Sri Lankan economic crisis. In 2024, Ranil Wickremasinghe in his role as the Minister of Investment Promotion proposed reforms to restore the Enterprise Sri Lanka concept by seeking an approval of the Cabinet of Ministers to establish a specially dedicated institution to serve the requirements of the SME sector.
