= Sheetgo =

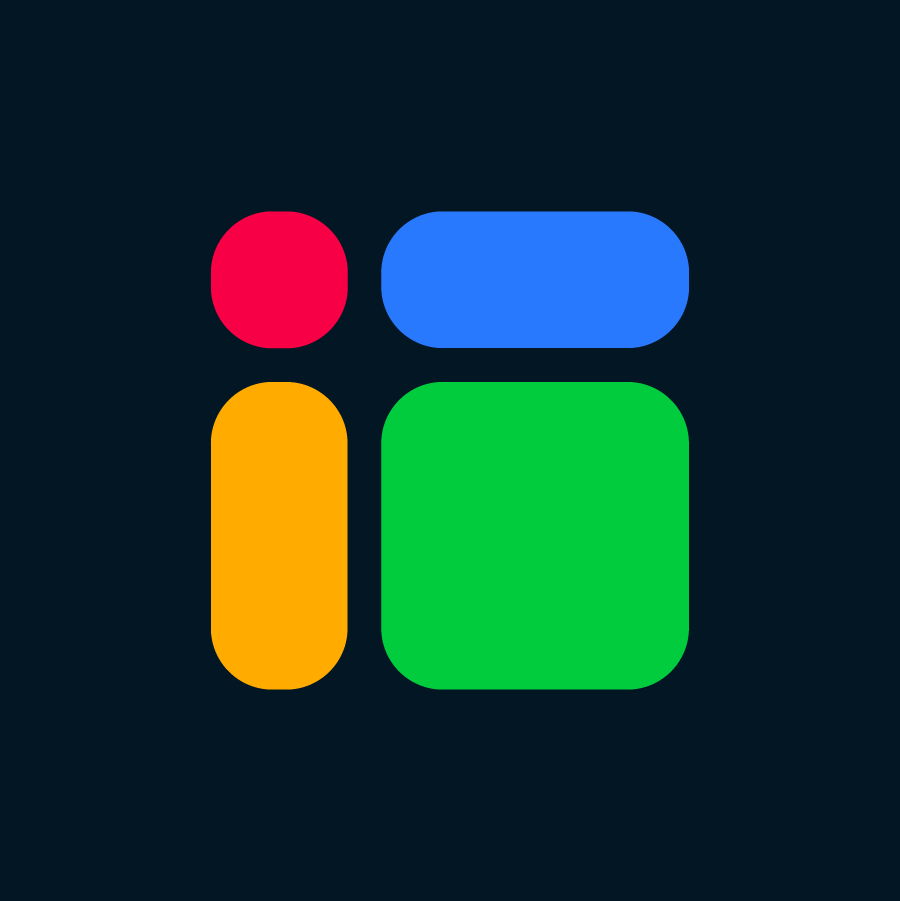
- Industry: Information and communication technology
- Founded: 2016
- Founder: Yannick Rault van der Vaart and Jonatan Gomes da Silva
- Headquarters: Valencia, Spain
- Area served: Worldwide
- Key people: Chad Pittman and Rafael Vidal
- Products: Spreadsheets
- Services: Specific software development
- Number of employees: 20
- Website: www.sheetgo.com

Sheetgo is a cloud-based automation tool that allows users to transfer data between spreadsheets and other office apps. The Spanish-Brazilian start-up was founded in 2016 by Yannick Rault Van der Vaart (CEO), Jonatan Gomes da Silva (CMO), Chad Pittman (Customer Success), and Rafael Vidal (CTO). Prior to launching Sheetgo, Van der Vaart and Gomes da Silva developed the first intelligent enterprise resource planning (ERP) system based on Google Sheets. They took the core feature of Google Sheets: the ability to connect spreadsheets online, and turned it into a system for automating data transfer and creating workflows. Sheetgo is compatible with various online storage and processing formats, and facilitates the traceability and automatic updating of data available in the cloud. Sheetgo has over 200,000 users in more than 60 countries. Customers include companies, non-profit organizations, universities and governments.

== History ==
The idea was first developed in a Brazilian social urbanism start-up founded by Van der Vaart. The company had to manage a large amount of data and used spreadsheets to store and analyze all the information.

In order to automate their processes and data workflows, the team needed a way to connect their spreadsheets and automate the transfer of data between them. One year later, in 2009, Van der Vaart and Gomes da Silva (who at that time led the IT department), created an application to enable this data transfer in spreadsheets. Sheetgo was widely validated in 2010 by several multinational tech companies when the founders were invited to present the system at Mountain View (California). Later, Pittman and Vidal joined the company, where they helped develop and implement the application.

The team developed several complementary technologies but decided to focus on a single product that was easily scalable to attract new partners and investors.

In 2015, the application was officially launched under the name "Import Sheet" and a year later, in February 2016, the company was selected for investment by a Brazilian technology accelerator. That same year they were also selected for investment by a Spanish seed accelerator, which led to the relocation of part of the team to Spain. Finally, in 2017, "Import Sheet" was renamed Sheetgo and the company was able to raise both subsidized debt and additional equity totaling 600,000 euros of financing, from the startup accelerators and from other public and private entities.

== Features ==
Sheetgo is a SaaS compatible with any web browser and available for Windows, Mac and Linux. The application connects data in spreadsheets and automatically synchronizes them, facilitating the creation of workflow management and data governance solutions.

== Awards and Financing ==
- In 2016, Sheetgo received the backing of a startup accelerator in Brazil, and another in Valencia, Spain, obtaining the support of both through convertible loans.
- In 2017, Sheetgo received a financial grant from the CDTI (Center for Industrial Technological Development).
- In 2018, Sheetgo was awarded the Emprendedores XXI Award, granted by CaixaBank, ENISA, Caixa Capital RISC and BPI as one of the most innovative proposals in the field of Information and Communication Technologies (ICT).
