= Churn rate =

Measure of individuals moving out of a group

Churn rate (also known as attrition rate, customer turnover, or customer defection) is a metric that measures the proportion of individuals (e.g. employees), customers, or items that leave a defined group during a specified period of time. In business and economics, it is commonly used to assess customer retention and the stability of recurring-revenue models, particularly in subscription-based or contractual services.

Churn rate is widely applied in industries with contractual customer bases, such as telecommunications, subscription media services, software-as-a-service (SaaS), and utilities. It is a key input in customer lifetime value (CLV) modeling and is often used to evaluate marketing effectiveness and long-term revenue sustainability. The term originates from the analogy of agitation in a butter churn, reflecting continuous customer movement in and out of a service base.

== Calculation ==
Churn rate is calculated by dividing the total number of individuals, customers, or items lost during a period divided by total number of individuals during the same period.

$\text{Churn}=\frac{L}{T}*100 = \frac{\text{Customers lost}}{\text{Total customers during time period}} * 100$

For example, if your company lost 50 customers in month, while having a total of 500 customers at the start of the month, the total churn rate is 10% (50/500*100 = 10%).

An alternative calculation for churn is to divide by the number of customers acquired during the same time period, rather than total number of customers.

== Customer base churn ==
Churn rate, when applied to a customer base, is the proportion of contractual customers or subscribers who leave a supplier during a given period. It may indicate customer dissatisfaction, cheaper and/or better offers from the competition, more successful sales and/or marketing by the competition, or reasons having to do with the customer life cycle.

Churn is closely related to the concept of average customer life time. For example, an annual churn rate of 25 percent implies an average customer life of four years. An annual churn rate of 33 percent implies an average customer life of three years. The churn rate can be minimized by creating barriers which discourage customers to change suppliers (contractual binding periods, use of proprietary technology, value-added services, unique business models, etc.), or through retention activities such as loyalty programs. It is possible to overstate the churn rate, as when a consumer drops the service but then restarts it within the same year. Thus, a clear distinction needs to be made between "gross churn", the total number of absolute disconnections, and "net churn", the overall loss of subscribers or members. The difference between the two measures is the number of new subscribers or members that have joined during the same period. Suppliers may find that if they offer a loss-leader "introductory special", it can lead to a higher churn rate and subscriber abuse, as some subscribers will sign on, let the service lapse, then sign on again to take continuous advantage of current specials.

When talking about subscribers or customers, sometimes the expression "survival rate" is used to mean 1 minus the churn rate. For example, for a group of subscribers, an annual churn rate of 25 percent is the same as an annual survival rate of 75 percent. Both imply a customer lifetime of four years because a customer lifetime can be calculated as the inverse of that customer's predicted churn rate. For a group or segment of customers, their customer life (or tenure) is the inverse of their aggregate churn rate. Gompertz distribution models of distribution of customer life times can therefore also predict a distribution of churn rates.

For companies with a fast-growing customer base (e.g., digital media companies in a BCG-matrix problem child or star phase), confusion can arise between the statistical analyses associated with what percentage of the whole customer base churns in a given year – What percentage of the base of subscribers in all of 2010 churned out? – versus a particular customer cohort's churn rate. For example: Taking those customers who subscribed in given month, say January 2010 – How many had churned out by January 2011? Examining churn for a fast-growing aggregated customer base will understate the true churn rate compared to cohort based approach to the calculation. The cohort based approach will also allow you to calculate the survival rate and the average customer life, whereas the aggregate approach can not calculate these two metrics.

In recent years, using AI and machine-learning as a means to calculate customer churn has become increasingly common for large retailers and service providers.

The phrase "rotational churn" is used to describe the phenomenon where a customer churns and immediately rejoins. This is common in prepaid mobile phone services, where existing customers may take up a new subscription from their current provider in order to avail of special offers only available to new customers.

In most circumstances churn is seen as indicating that customers are dissatisfied with a service. However, in some industries whose services delivers on a promise, churn is considered as a positive signal, such as the health care services, weight loss services and online dating platforms.

Some researchers have disputed the simple assumption that just dissatisfaction would lead customers to churn, and called for a more nuanced approach.

== See also ==
- Turnover (employment)
- Customer attrition
- Customer retention
- Attrition (research)
- Dropping out
