= Forward deployed engineer =

Customer-facing software engineering role

A forward-deployed engineer (FDE), also called a forward-deployed software engineer (FDSE), is a customer-facing software engineer who works for a company that makes a product and helps implement that product within a client company, often working alongside the client's employees for a defined period of time. The term "forward-deployed" comes from U.S. military jargon.

The responsibilities of forward-deployed engineers overlap with those of solutions architects, sales engineers, customer engineers, professional services engineers, systems integrators, and information technology consultants. For example, a company may embed a forward-deployed engineer with a customer for a few months to help them use an AI product sold by the company. This role is part of the go-to-market strategy for major AI companies that sell services to large enterprise customers.

The role was popularized by Palantir Technologies, which used this title for staff by 2009. Large companies including Anthropic, OpenAI, Amazon Web Services, Microsoft, and Google Cloud announced new divisions oriented around forward-deployed engineering in 2026. Tech companies listed significantly more job openings for this role between 2024 and 2025, with continued growth in 2026, but some software engineers consider the role to be undesirable because of the travel requirements and pressure to solve customer problems within relatively short amounts of time.

A professor of management wrote that this type of "unconventional title is not a response to occupational novelty but a strategic external projection of organizational identity, designed to shape how applicants, employees, and consumers perceive the organization". Venture capital firm Andreessen Horowitz described the title "forward-deployed engineer" as "title arbitrage", a way to signal new importance for roles previously called solutions engineers or integration engineers.

== See also ==
- Customer success
- Sales engineer or field applications engineer, performing a similar role for industrial machinery
