= James Berry (barrister) =

British barrister

James Berry KC

Member of Parliament for Kingston and Surbiton
- In office 7 May 2015 – 3 May 2017
- Preceded by: Ed Davey
- Succeeded by: Ed Davey

Personal details
- Born: Michael James Ellwood Berry; 4 August 1983 (age 43) Canterbury, England
- Party: Conservative
- Education: University College London; Harvard University
- Website: Official website

Michael James Ellwood Berry KC (born 4 August 1983) is a British barrister who took silk in 2025. Berry is a former Conservative Party politician who served as Member of Parliament (MP) for Kingston and Surbiton from May 2015 to May 2017.

In 2017 he returned to practising law at Serjeants' Inn Chambers. In March 2025, Berry was appointed Kings Counsel.

== Early life ==
Berry was born and brought up in the city of Canterbury in Kent. From 1996 to 2001, he was educated at King's School, Canterbury, an independent school in his home city, followed by University College London, from which he graduated, and finally at the Harvard Law School in the United States, where he received a degree in law.

== Career ==
Returning to England, Berry worked as a barrister in London, specialising in healthcare, professional negligence, and police law. In May 2015, he was elected as the Member of Parliament for Kingston and Surbiton. During his campaign, he had stressed education as a key interest. Berry strongly supports implementation of mindfulness meditation practices and beliefs for children in schools, which he states will positively impact pupils' future workplace productivity.

Berry was at odds with his party with regard to lowering the voting age, for he was an advocate of the franchise being extended to 16- and 17-year olds. He was opposed to Brexit at the time of the 2016 referendum, and his constituency voted in favour of remaining in the European Union. However, Berry subsequently voted with the government to pass the Article 50 bill which became the European Union (Notification of Withdrawal) Act 2017.

At the 2017 general election, Berry lost his seat, despite gaining almost 600 votes more than his 2015 result. The constituency's previous MP, Ed Davey of the Liberal Democrats, who had served from 1997 to 2015, beat him by a margin of 4,124 votes.

In June 2017, Berry's chambers announced that he was returning to practising law full-time.

== Personal life ==
Berry married a Harvard graduate in August 2013.

Parliament of the United Kingdom
| Preceded by Ed Davey | Member of Parliament for Kingston and Surbiton; 2015–2017 | Succeeded by Ed Davey |
