= 2024 Liberal Democrats leadership election =

Leadership election in the United Kingdom

- 2–18 December 2024
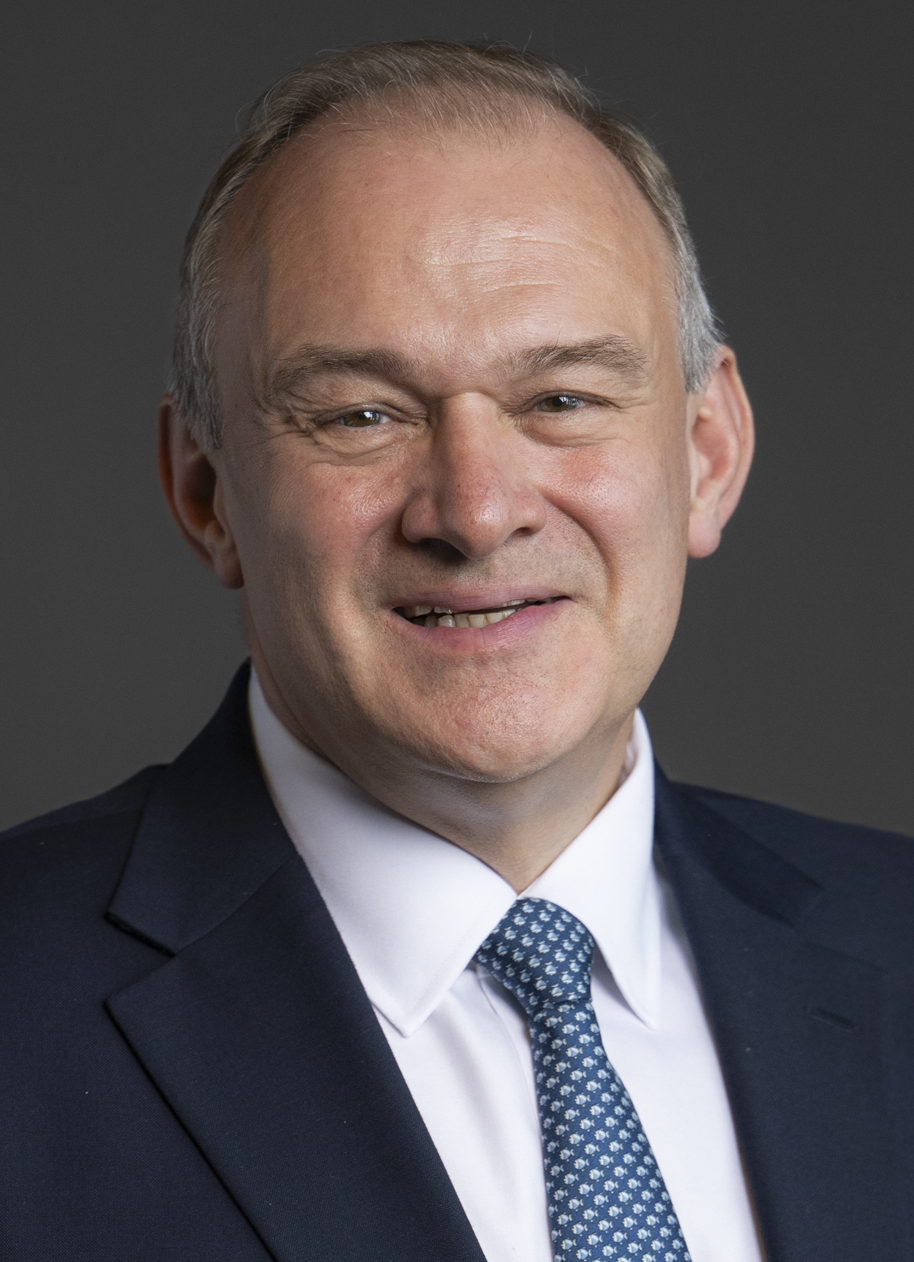
| Candidate | Ed Davey |
| Popular vote | Unopposed |
Leader before election
Ed Davey
Elected Leader
Ed Davey

The 2024 Liberal Democrats leadership election was held in December 2024 due to the requirement in the Liberal Democrats' party constitution that a leadership election should be held at least once during each Westminster parliament.

Incumbent party leader Ed Davey, under whom the Liberal Democrats had their best ever performance in the 2024 general election, was the only candidate and was elected unopposed.
