= Energy customer switching =

Energy customer switching is a concept stemming from the global energy markets. The concept refers to the action of one energy customer switching energy supplier, a switch is essentially seen as the free (by choice) movement of a customer. In addition to that a switch can include:

- A re-switch: When a customer switches for the second or subsequent time.
- A switch-back: When a customer switches back to his/her former or previous supplier.

If a customer moves, there is often a switch, however this will only be counted if the customer is not dealing with the incumbent in the new area of residence.

The above is the official definition of switching and is being used by public energy institutions such as CEER & ERGEG (forerunner to ACER). The definition was originally developed by Dr Philip E. Lewis.

Switching is a key concept to understanding competition-related issues on the global energy markets as the switching level of a concrete market reveals the state of the competition; High switching rates equals high level of competition and low switching rates equals limited competition. Thus measuring and assessing switching rates is necessary in order to have a correct impression of the energy markets. The action of switching is often done via a price comparison website or by the traditional door-to-door sales method, where a salesperson assists the customer in switching.

This is a concept that has become particularly popular in countries such as the United Kingdom, Australia, France, Spain and Germany, where large numbers of competitor brands operate.
