= Product–market fit =

Degree to which a product satisfies a strong market demand

Product–market fit is the degree to which a product satisfies a specific market segment.

Product–market fit has been defined by its inventor as "a unique product offering that people desperately want". It is a first step to building a successful venture in which the company meets early adopters, gathers feedback and gauges interest in its products.

== History ==
According to Benchmark Capital co-founder Andy Rachleff, Sequoia Capital founder Don Valentine developed the thinking behind product–market fit, but it was Andy who first put a name to it. Venture capitalist Marc Andreessen of Andreessen Horowitz later popularized the term in the mid-2000s. Andreessen credits Rachleff for the concept, referring to the idea as Rachleff's Corollary of Startup Success: "The only thing that matters is getting to product/market fit."

Marc Andreessen defined the term as follows: "Product/market fit means being in a good market with a product that can satisfy that market." Many people interpret product–market fit as creating a so called minimum viable product that addresses and solves a problem or need that exists.

Steve Blank referred to the concept of product–market fit as a step in between customer validation (step #2 in his book The Four Steps to the Epiphany) and customer creation (step #3).

== Interpretations ==
Product–market fit might be interpreted in terms of Alexander Osterwalder's Business Model Canvas paradigm as comprising value proposition, customer segment, relationship, and channel. Achieving product–market fit implies these are set without requiring additional changes or pivots.

== Popular metrics ==
=== The 40% rule ===
One metric for product–market fit is if at least 40% percent of surveyed customers indicate that they would be "very disappointed" if they no longer have access to a particular product or service. Alternatively, it could be measured by having at least 40% of surveyed customers considering the product or service as "must have". Sean Ellis is noted for popularizing this heuristic after examining many startups.

=== Analytics metrics ===
There are five metrics any online business can measure to empirically verify if they achieved product–market fit. They are:

- Bounce rate
- Time on site
- Pages per visit
- Returning visitors
- Customer lifetime value

Low bounce rates mean visitors' expectations are being met. High time on site and pages per visit indicate that the experience of the user is satisfactory. A regularly returning visitor reflects the lasting impact a product has on their customers, causing them to come back, and customer lifetime value measures the profitability each customer brings to the company. If these five metrics are above average and the 40% rule is met, the product and market are said to fit.

=== Common mistakes ===
Andy Rachleff says there are four common product–market fit mistakes:

1. Prioritizing well-known customers over desperate ones: "The counterintuitive thing is that you should not go after the big market first. It's the exact opposite of what everyone tells you."
2. Iterating on the what instead of the who: If a product does not resonate with an audience, founders often want to change the product. But Andy says founders should instead focus on shifting the customer they are creating the product for.
3. Pursuing growth before value: Many founders are tempted to engineer growth with ads and other scale tactics too early, but that artificial growth can cause them to wrongly assume they have truly found product–market fit.
4. Slowing down on innovation: Product–market fit is a process, not a one-time achievement. As markets, customers, and competitors shift, product–market fit must be continually reassessed and pursued.

It is important to differentiate between product–market fit and problem–solution fit when measuring a company's customer base. More specifically, when gauging a customer's desire, companies need to be sure they are measuring desire for the product or service—not just for a solution. Misinterpreting customers' desire for a solution as desire for a company's product or service will end up being a false positive for product–market fit.

Product–market fit is not binary. For a fledgling startup, a minimum degree of product–market fit will not be adequate in order to achieve market traction and success. Rather, what is actually required is a high degree of product–market fit, or extreme product-market fit.

== See also ==
- Cohort analysis
- Customer churn
- Lean startup
- Revenue stream
