= Customer retention =

Ability of a company or product to retain its customers over some specified period

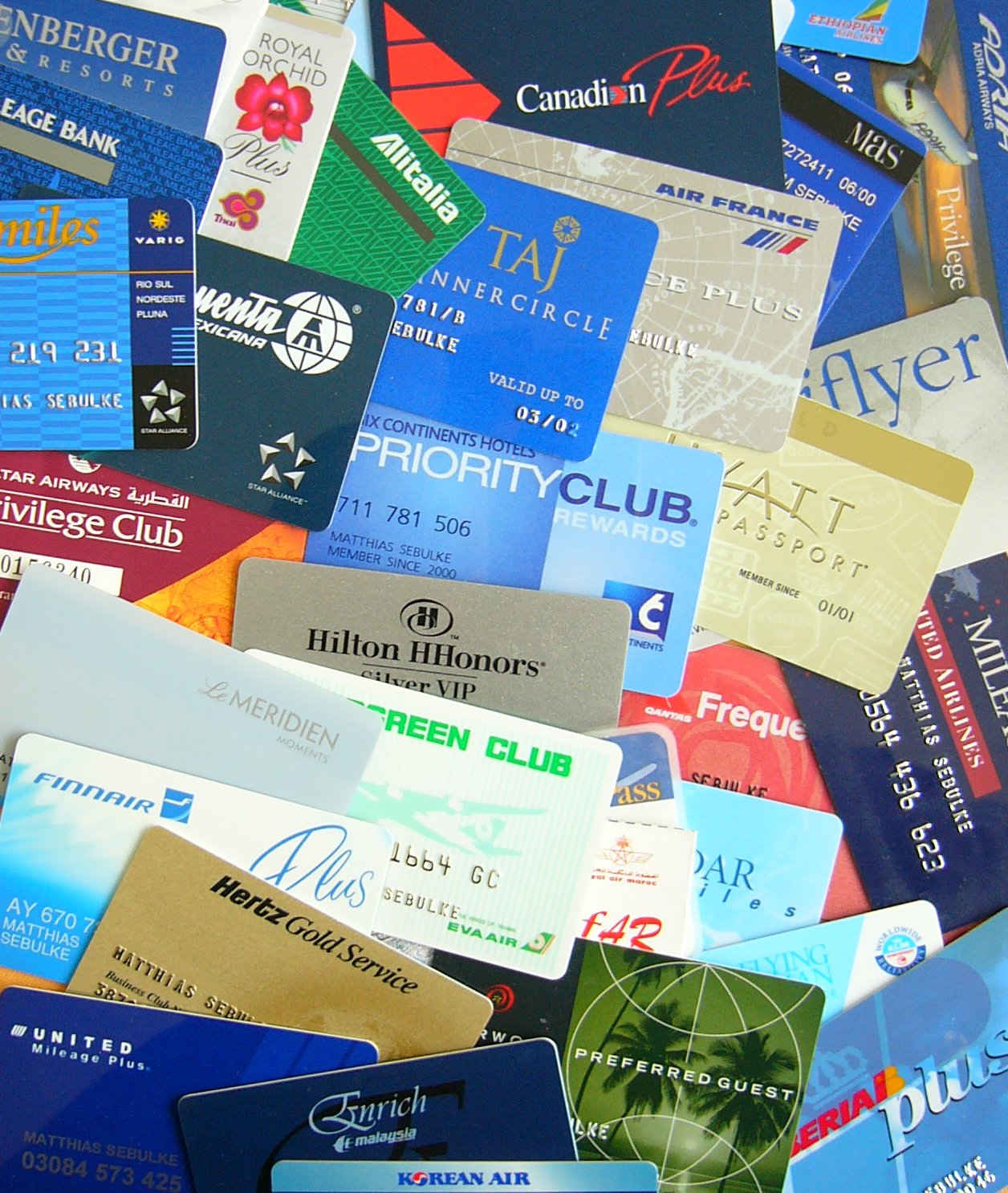
Customer loyality cards for a variety of companies

Customer retention refers to the ability of a company or product to retain its customers over some specified period. High customer retention means customers of the product or business tend to return to, continue to buy or in some other way not defect to another product or business, or to non-use entirely. Selling organizations generally attempt to reduce customer defections. Customer retention starts with the first contact an organization has with a customer and continues throughout the entire lifetime of a relationship and successful retention efforts take this entire lifecycle into account. A company's ability to attract and retain new customers is related not only to its product or services, but also to the way it services its existing customers, the value the customers actually perceive as a result of utilizing the solutions, and the reputation it creates within and across the marketplace.

Successful customer retention involves more than giving the customer what they expect. Generating loyal advocates of the brand might mean exceeding customer expectations. Creating customer loyalty puts 'customer value rather than maximizing profits and shareholder value at the center of business strategy'. The key differentiation in a competitive environment is often the delivery of a consistently high standard of customer service. Furthermore, in the emerging world of Customer Success, retention is a major objective.

Customer retention has a direct impact on profitability. Research by John Fleming and Jim Asplund indicates that engaged customers generate 1.7 times more revenue than normal customers while having engaged employees and engaged customers return a revenue gain of 3.4 times the norm.

== Measurement ==
The measurement of customer retention should distinguish between behavioral intentions and actual customer behaviors. The use of behavioral intentions as an indicator of customer retention is based on the premise that intentions are a strong predictor of future behaviors, such that customers who express a stronger repurchase intention toward a brand or firm will also exhibit stronger corresponding behaviors. Customer repurchase and retention behaviors can be measured in a variety of different ways which are enumerated in several award-winning articles published in the marketing discipline. The different studies that also involve different metrics to measure customer repurchase intention and actual repurchase behaviors are summarized in a series of review papers such as Keiningham and colleagues (2007), and Morgan and Rego (2006). These studies point to the following general conclusions:

1. Customer satisfaction is a strong predictor of both customer repurchase intentions and repurchase behavior
2. Repurchase intentions are statistically significant, and positively associated with repurchase behavior: as people's repurchase intention increases, so does their likelihood to actually repurchase the brand. However, the magnitude of the association, though positive, is moderate to weak—suggesting that intentions and behaviors are not interchangeable constructs to measure customer retention.
3. The association between different retention metrics is not always straightforward. It can be (a) non-linear exhibiting increasing or diminishing returns, (b) different for different customer segments), and also vary by type of industry.
4. Customer retention is a strong predictor of a firm's financial success, both using accounting and stock market metrics. A study of a Brazilian bank showed that bank branches that were more adept at efficiently satisfying and retaining customers were more profitable than their counterparts that did one or the other but not both.

In terms of measurement, the intention measures can typically be obtained using scale items embedded in a customer survey. The retention behaviors must be measured using secondary data such as/ accounting measures of the volume (amount and financial value) and frequency with which a customer purchases the firm's goods or services. This requires that the firm should have a strong customer information management department that can capture all the relevant metrics that may be needed for analysis. In a typical firm, these may come from a diverse set of departments such as accounting, sales, marketing, finance, logistics, and other customer research.

== Antecedents and drivers ==
Customer retention is an outcome that is the result of several different antecedents as described below.

1. Customer satisfaction: Research shows that customer satisfaction is a direct driver of customer retention in a wide variety of industries. Despite the claims made by some one-off studies, the bulk of the evidence is unambiguously clear: there is a positive association between customer satisfaction and customer retention/ though the magnitude of the association can vary based on a whole host of factors such as customer, product, and industry characteristics. Some companies and individuals have created mathematical models to evaluate customer satisfaction.
2. Customer delight: Some scholars argue that in today's competitive world, merely satisfying customers is not enough; firms need to delight customers by providing exceptionally strong service. It is delighted customers who are likely to stay with the firm, and improve overall customer retention. More recently, it has been argued that customer delight may be more strongly applicable to hedonic goods and services rather than for utilitarian products and services.
3. Customer switching costs: Burnham, Frels, and Mahajan (2003, p. 110) define switching costs as "one-time costs that customers associate with the process of switching from one provider to another." Customers usually encounter three types of switching costs: (1) financial switching costs (e.g., fees to break contract, lost reward points); (2) procedural switching costs (time, effort, and uncertainty in locating, adopting, and using a new brand/provider); and (3) relational switching costs (personal relationships and identification with brand and employees). A recent meta-analysis examined 233 effects from over 133,000 customers and found that all three types of switching costs increased customer retention—however, relational switching costs have the strongest association with customer repurchase intentions and behavior.
4. Customer relationship management: Acknowledging the social and relational aspects—especially those embedded in services—it has been argued that firms can increase retention by focusing on managing customer relationships. Relationship management occurs when firms can take a longer-terms perspective, rather than a transactional perspective to managing their customer base. However, all long-term customers are not profitable, and worth retaining; sometimes, short-term transactional customers can be more profitable for the firm. As such, companies may have to strategically develop a framework to manage unprofitable customers.

== Customer lifetime value ==
Customer lifetime value enables an organization to calculate the net present value of the profit an organization will realize on a customer over a given period of time. Retention Rate is the percentage of the total number of customers retained in context to the customers that approached for cancelation.

== Standardization of customer service ==
Published standards exist to help organizations deliver process-driven customer satisfaction and Customer Success in order to increase the lifespan of a customer. The International Customer Service Institute (TICSI) has released The International Standard for Service Excellence (TISSE 2012). TISSE 2012 enables organizations to focus their attention on delivering excellence in the management of customer service, whilst at the same time providing recognition of success through a 3rd Party certification scheme. TISSE 2012 focuses an organization's attention on delivering increased customer satisfaction by helping the organization through a Service Quality Model. TISSE Service Quality Model uses the 5 P's - Policy, Processes, People, Premises, Product/Service, as well as performance measurement. The implementation of a customer service standard leads to improved customer service practices, underlying operating procedures and eventually, higher levels of customer satisfaction, which in turn increases customer loyalty and customer retention.

== See also ==
- Churn rate – Measure of individuals moving out of a group
- Customer attrition – Loss of clients or customers
- Customer loyalty – Marketing term for a consumer's emotional attachment to a given brand
- Customer service – Provision of service to customers
- Customer Success – Proactive outcome-focused business methodology
- Serial switcher – Marketing term
- The International Customer Service Institute – International partnership organisation for sharing of best practices in customer service
