= Customer attrition =

Loss of clients or customers

Customer attrition, also known as customer churn, customer turnover, or customer defection, is the loss of clients or customers.

Companies often use customer attrition analysis and customer attrition rates as one of their key business metrics (along with cash flow, EBITDA, etc.) because the cost of retaining an existing customer is far less than the cost of acquiring a new one. Examples include banks, telephone service companies, internet service providers, pay TV companies, insurance firms, and alarm monitoring services. Companies from these sectors often have customer service branches which attempt to win back defecting clients, because recovered long-term customers can be worth much more to a company than newly recruited clients.

Companies usually make a distinction between voluntary churn and involuntary churn. Voluntary churn occurs due to a decision by the customer to switch to another company or service provider, involuntary churn occurs due to circumstances such as a customer's relocation to a long-term care facility, death, or the relocation to a distant location. In most applications, involuntary reasons for churn are excluded from the analytical models. Analysts tend to concentrate on voluntary churn, because it typically occurs due to factors of the company-customer relationship which companies control, such as how billing interactions are handled or how after-sales help is provided.

When companies are measuring their customer turnover, they typically make the distinction between gross attrition and net attrition. Gross attrition is the loss of existing customers and their associated recurring revenue for contracted goods or services during a particular period. Net attrition is gross attrition plus the addition or recruitment of similar customers at the original location. Financial institutions often track and measure attrition using a weighted calculation, called Monthly Recurring Revenue (or MRR). In the 2000s, there are also a number of business intelligence software programs which can mine databases of customer information and analyze the factors that are associated with customer attrition, such as dissatisfaction with service or technical support, billing disputes, or a disagreement over company policies. More sophisticated predictive analytics software use churn prediction models that predict customer churn by assessing their propensity of risk to churn. Since these models generate a small prioritized list of potential defectors, they are effective at focusing customer retention marketing programs on the subset of the customer base who are most vulnerable to churn.

== Retail services applications ==
Financial services such as banking and insurance use applications of predictive analytics for churn modeling, because customer retention is an essential part of most financial services' business models. Other sectors have also discovered the power of predictive analytics, including retailing, telecommunications and pay-TV operators. One of the main objectives of modeling customer churn is to determine the causal factors, so that the company can try to prevent the attrition from happening in the future. Some companies want to prevent their good customers from deteriorating (e.g., by falling behind in their payments) and becoming less profitable customers, so they introduced the notion of partial customer churn.

Customer attrition merits special attention by mobile telecom service providers worldwide. This is due to the low barriers to switching to a competing service provider especially with the advent of Mobile Number Portability (MNP) in several countries. This allows customers to switch to another provider while preserving their phone numbers. While mature markets with high teledensity (phone market penetration) have churn rates ranging from 1% to 2% per month, high growth developing markets such as India and China are experiencing churn rates between 3% and 4% per month. By deploying new technologies such churn prediction models coupled with effective retention programs, customer attrition could be better managed to stem the significant revenue loss from defecting customers.

Customer attrition is a major concern for US and Canadian banks, because they have much higher churn rates than banks in Western Europe. US and Canadian banks with the lowest churn rates have achieved customer turnover rates as low as 12% per year, by using tactics such as free checking accounts, online banking and bill payment, and improved customer service. However, once banks can improve their churn rates by improving customer service, they can reach a point beyond which further customer service will not improve retention; other tactics or approaches need to be explored.

Churn or Customer attrition is often used as an indicator of customer satisfaction. However the churn rate can be kept artificially low by making it difficult for the customers to resiliate their services. This can include ignoring resiliations requests, implementing lengthy and complicated resiliation procedures to follow through by an average consumer and various other barriers to resiliation. Thus, churn can improve while customer satisfaction deteriorates. This practice is short sighted and will backfire. However, it was shown to be common in telephone companies and among internet providers.

== Research ==
Scholars have studied customer attrition at European financial services companies, and investigated the predictors of churn and how the use of customer relationship management (CRM) approaches can impact churn rates. Several studies combine several different types of predictors to develop a churn model. This model can take demographic characteristics, environmental changes, and other factors into account.

Research on customer attrition data modeling may provide businesses with several tools for enhancing customer retention. Using data mining and software, one may apply statistical methods to develop nonlinear attrition causation models. One researcher notes that "...retaining existing customers is more profitable than acquiring new customers due primarily to savings on acquisition costs, the higher volume of service consumption, and customer referrals." The argument is that to build an "...effective customer retention program," managers have to come to an understanding of "...why customers leave" and "...identify the customers with high risk of leaving" by accurately predicting customer attrition.

Customer attrition modeling has a dual objective. First, it should achieve good predictive performance, which is often measured using area under the ROC curve or top decile lift. Second, it should deliver insights in the drivers of churn to steer managerial decisions.

== Prediction ==
In the business context, "churn" refers both to customers' migration and to their loss of value. So, "churn rate" refers, on the one hand, to the percentage of customers who end their relation with the organization, or, on the other hand, to the customers who still receive their services, but not as much or not as often as they used to. Current organizations face therefore a huge challenge: to be able to anticipate to customers’ abandon in order to retain them on time, reducing this way costs and risks and gaining efficiency and competitivity. There are in the market advanced analytics tools and applications, especially designed to analyze in depth the enormous amount of data inside the organizations, and to make predictions based on the information obtained from analyzing and exploring those data. They aim to put at the service of marketing departments and agencies –and of all business users- the necessary weapons to:

- Detect soon which customers are about to abandon and to know them in depth, answering to questions such as: Who are they? or How do they behave?
- Know the real value of the potential loss of those customers, with the aim of establishing priorities and distributing business efforts and resources efficiently, optimizing resources and maximizing the value of the current customers’ portfolio.
- Put into practice personalized retention plans in order to reduce or avoid their migration, increasing the capability to react and anticipating to possible non-predicted fugues.

== Reduction ==
There are organizations that have developed international standards regarding recognition and sharing of global best practice in customer service in order to reduce customer attrition. The International Customer Service Institute has developed The International Customer Service Standard to strategically align organizations so they focus on delivering excellence in customer service, whilst at the same time providing recognition of success through a 3rd Party registration scheme.

== Management ==
Not all customer attrition is bad. For many firms, it is useful and desirable that unprofitable customers should churn away. This is known as customer divestment of unprofitable customers. However, simply because a customer is unprofitable does not mean that the customer should be divested, because there are strategic reasons for retaining unprofitable customers.

== See also ==
- Churn rate
- Customer retention
- Revenue stream
- Product/market fit
