= MHP Communications =

Public relations (PR) firm based in the United Kingdom

- Company type: UK private company
- Industry: Professional services
- Founded: London, UK (2010)
- Number of employees: 230
- Parent: Next 15 Group plc
- Website: mhpgroup.com

MHP Group is a public relations and public affairs firm, formed in 2010 from the merger of Mandate Communications, Hogarth PR and Penrose. It is owned by Next 15 Group plc.

On launch the firm was one of the ten largest PR firms in the UK. MHP is a member of the Association of Professional Political Consultants.

== Clients ==
Their clients include Astra Zeneca, LEGO, Spotify, Pottermore Publishing and SSE.

== Staff ==
Alex Bigg has been the CEO of MHP since 2016. Paul Burstow, former health minister of the UK, was named to company's board of advisors in September 2015.

== International offices ==
MHP is headquartered in London.
