= Sales engineering =

Hybrid profession of sales and engineering

Sales engineering is a hybrid profession of sales and engineering that exists in industrial and commercial markets.

Buying decisions in these markets are made differently than those in many consumer contexts, being based more on technical information and rational analysis and less on style, fashion, or impulse.

Sales engineers are salespersons that have both sales and engineering expertise, allowing them to communicate with customers about technical aspects of a product, business, and business case. They may also advise and support customers on technical and procurement matters. Employers of sales engineers may include business-to-business companies, distributors, and engineering consultancies.

== External functions ==
=== Sales and consultancy ===
The purpose of the job is to help potential customers understand, compare, and contrast the solutions that are available for purchase (the pre-sales role); to troubleshoot problems with their implementations—that is, to help ensure that the solutions work successfully once a purchase is made (the post-sales role); and to maximize sales for the sales engineer's employer by providing help to customers (the aspect of the job that puts the "sales" in the title sales engineer).

==== Conflict-of-interest management and return-on-investment demonstration ====
It is understood in the market, by both the sales engineer and his or her wary industrial client, that the sales portion of the sales engineering role inherently involves a conflict of interest (COI), because it is always possible that the ideal solutions could involve recommending a competitor's products or services. However, the sales engineer is under pressure to steer the customer towards their employer's product. Thus, customers are generally wary of advice given by sales engineers. Nevertheless, sales engineers do usually provide real value to customers, which is why the role endures despite customers' apprehension. The customer's only motivation to participate in the encounter is to achieve return on investment (ROI) in one way or another. Toward that end, sales engineering increasingly relies on any information technology that can help quantify ROI. This is summed up in the aphorism that "at the end of the day, the customer just wants to know for sure that they will gain A dollars over the next B years (via reduced expenses or increased sales) if they pay C dollars up front for product D."

=== Application development ===
Another function of the sales engineer is to introduce modified, improved, and/or advanced technology to potential users who may have an application but who have not yet acquired knowledge of the material or technique in question. The sales engineer may conduct training sessions or demonstrations to accomplish this. The task of seeking out industries, firms, or business models that do not yet use a certain product (for example, a CAx system or a CRM system) and causing them to adopt a new approach using that product is what puts the "applications" in "applications engineering" or "application development" (not to be confused with another common sense of that term, which refers to software development and programming). The task is to seek out and develop new applications for the product, in order to increase sales. The customer's only motivation for adopting it is "what it can do for me", such as same-output-lower-costs, more-output-same-cost, etc. Thus, when things work out correctly, both firms profit from the application development.

This result also has broader economic implications, as it is a mechanism by which economic efficiency increases, productivity grows, and economic growth is encouraged. Inventors and R&D people create new tools and processes; but they do not disseminate into the business world (to do any economic good) without some amount of applications development, teaching (from exposing decision-makers via trade shows to providing workers with training), and sales.

=== Teaching customers ===
Many products and services purchased by large companies and institutions are highly complex. Examples include airliners, weapons systems, and IT systems (such as telecommunications, or databases and their dependent applications for purposes such as logistics or customer relationship management). Sales engineers advise customers on how best to use the products or services provided.

The sales process also may require some technical proof of concept or tech demo to be assured of the practicality of the solution. Sales engineers normally will ensure these efforts are successful.

=== Rise of digital sales tools and AI in sales engineering ===
==== AI and digital transformation ====
In recent years, digital transformation has greatly influenced the role of sales engineers. Tools powered by artificial intelligence (AI), such as conversational analytics, lead scoring, and predictive forecasting, enable sales engineers to better understand customer behavior and provide more personalized solutions. Modern CRM platforms, like Salesforce and HubSpot, integrate AI to support deeper customer insights and automate routine tasks, allowing sales engineers to focus on consultative selling. Industry commentary has also argued that AI is transforming the sales engineering role.

=== Remote and virtual selling ===
==== Virtual and hybrid selling ====
The shift toward remote and hybrid work models has redefined the way sales engineers interact with clients. Virtual demonstrations, remote onboarding, and digital collaboration platforms such as Zoom, Microsoft Teams, and Miro have become standard. Sales engineers are now expected to deliver compelling technical pitches and support services without being physically present, necessitating strong digital communication skills and adaptability.

=== Cross-functional collaboration and customer success integration ===
==== Integration with customer success ====
Sales engineers are now expected to work closely with Customer Success teams to ensure the long-term success of the deployed solution. This collaboration helps with onboarding, adoption, and renewal by aligning technical outcomes with business goals. It fosters stronger client relationships and reduces churn, especially in Software-as-a-Service (SaaS) industries.

=== Diversity, equity, and inclusion (DEI) in sales engineering ===
==== Diversity and inclusion in sales engineering ====
The tech industry, including sales engineering, is making strides toward improving gender and cultural diversity. Initiatives from organizations like Women in Sales Engineering (WISE) and programs promoting STEM for underrepresented groups are working to ensure more inclusive representation in technical sales roles.

=== Environmental and ethical considerations in sales engineering ===
==== Sustainability and ethical selling ====
Modern sales engineers are often required to account for the environmental impact and ethical implications of the solutions they offer. Green technologies, energy efficiency, and sustainable product lifecycle considerations are becoming standard in technical sales discussions. Transparent communication about compliance with environmental standards such as ISO 14001 is now part of the sales process.

== Internal functions ==
=== Proposal preparation ===
The sales of systems and solutions delivered by these companies are complex and usually require extensive documentation that describes what is being proposed and what the company commits to deliver. The sales engineer is in charge of preparing technical proposals, or scopes of work (SoWs), which are usually subject to technical negotiation with the customer prior to the provider being able to submit a commercial proposal. In order to prepare the commercial proposal, once the scope of the proposed solution is finalized, the sales engineer is typically also in charge of gathering all the inputs from internal stakeholders (product, R&D, delivery, services, finance, legal, etc.) so that profit and loss (P&L) can be calculated, pricing can be established and final commercial proposal can be approved and submitted to the customer.

=== Tailoring of solutions ===
Sales engineers also collaborate with the design, production, engineering, or R&D departments of their companies to determine how products and services could be made or modified to suit customers' needs. This aspect of sales engineering is important, because it is what allows the sales engineer to feel that they can maintain their personal integrity (ethically speaking) in the face of the inherent COI of the job (explained earlier). The sales engineer does not have to lie (ignore or negatively misrepresent the competitor's products or services) if they can reasonably tell the customer that their employer can tailor its solutions to the customer's particular requirements. Doing that may not be easy or cheap, which means that there is always a line to be walked to avoid overpromising-and/or-underdelivering.

== Personnel considerations ==
=== Talents, skills, and knowledge ===
The companies that employ sales engineers need to sell their products or services to generate income, but since engineers and scientists usually have substantially different personality traits than those required for sales work, there is a role for people with a combination of abilities. These individuals must have technical understanding of the complexities of what their company supplies together with sales skills. This combination of traits is not common.

=== Education and training ===
Sales engineers typically hold a bachelor's degree in engineering or a related technical field, and many receive substantial on‑the‑job training on their employer's products and markets. In addition to general engineering degrees, a growing number of universities offer structured programs that combine engineering coursework with sales, marketing, and technical communication. Examples include the University of Florida's Sales Engineering minor, Texas A&M University's Technical Sales minor, and Iowa State University's Engineering Sales minor, each designed to prepare graduates for business‑to‑business technical sales roles by pairing domain knowledge with customer‑facing skills.

=== Travel, communications, telepresence, and compensation ===
Sales engineers may spend 20% to 70% of their time traveling, and they may work a flexible schedule due to the needs of the sales organization they support. Most sales engineers telecommute or spend a limited amount of time in the office. Skills with IT that help remote people communicate better, such as teleconferencing, videoconferencing, web conferencing, and telepresence (e.g., GoToMeeting, WebEx, live meeting, Fuze Meeting) are put to good use both on and off the road.

Sales engineers, like their sales representative counterparts, are hired based on their geographic location rather than their proximity to the corporate, or even regional, office. Working in another part of the country, or even outside the country, where the corporate offices are, a sales engineer may only make it to corporate headquarters once or twice each year.

A key differentiator between sales engineers and other roles within the organization is that a sales engineer is usually compensated by salary plus commission, as most sales representatives are. This commission is usually paid out when the sales representative is paid. Far less common is the case where a sales engineer is compensated with a base salary plus bonus. The bonus can be based upon the revenue generated within an assigned territory, set up as a management by objectives (MBO) bonus, or a combination of the two. In both cases a sales engineer will make a base salary that is proportionally higher than their sales representative counterparts, and significantly more than the traditional engineers in an organization.

=== Sales engineering resources ===
Sales engineering is often different from traditional sales roles. The systems, products, and technology that a sales engineer sells are often complex and expensive. Traditional sales strategies, especially "hard closing" techniques, may not work and in some cases can even hurt a sale. As technology advances, so must the sales strategy of a sales engineer. The North American Association of Sales Engineers has done much to advance awareness of the field across all industries and has further resources available.

=== Consultative approach ===
Sales engineers and technical sales reps must understand perfectly the product or service they are selling; they should be able to explain in detail how it works, what business value it offers, and the results that customers will achieve. They also have to sell the idea of why customers need to make a change to move forward to the solution offered. Sales engineering uses a lot of discovery questions to uncover the challenges that customers have in their business or the outcomes they can't drive.

== See also ==
- Forward-deployed engineer: not different in essence; terminology varies by industry
