= Customer switching =

Marketing term

In marketing and microeconomics, customer switching or consumer switching describes "customers/consumers abandoning a product or service in favor of a competitor". Assuming constant price, product or service quality, counteracting this behaviour in order to achieve maximal customer retention is the business of marketing, public relations and advertising. Brand switching—as opposed to brand loyalty is the outcome of customer switching behaviour.

== Reasons ==
Variability in quality or market price fluctuations—especially a rise in prices—may lead customers to consult price comparison services, where alternative suppliers may be offered. Declining customer satisfaction may be due to poor service quality but also—to a lesser degree—be a symptom of boredom with the brand of choice. Brand loyalty can be very strong, however, and the longer a commitment to a brand lasts, the stronger the ties will usually be.

According to a 2013 Nielsen study on customer loyalty, brand switching can happen for 5 main reasons, but mainly based on price considerations. The overall global averages are:

1. Better Price (41%)
2. Better Quality (26%)
3. Better Service Agreement (15%)
4. Better Selection (10%)
5. Better Features (8%)

Because of the dominant role of pricing, market tactics like penetration pricing have evolved to offer a convincing incentive for switching. Along with these are the factors like service inconvenience, poor location, ethical issues like hard selling or unsafe products and also change in customers' income levels. Another approach is the advertisement for vaporware that seemingly will offer newer or better features than established products without actually possessing any innovation.

== Affected sectors ==
Switching is a significant business factor affecting revenues for companies providing continuously delivered services, as is the case for the energy market as opposed to sectors providing products that stimulate non- or sparsely recurring purchase because of the durability of the product or a general orientation towards casual customers. Energy customer switching is a significant risk or success factor for energy suppliers.

== Serial switching ==
The term serial switcher was first coined by Charles Turner and David Alexander in their customer relationship management course and then their CRM Pocketbook. It describes a person, who continually moves his/her patronage from one company to another and highlights the ignorance of many organizations, including credit card companies, who strive for customer acquisition regardless of retention rates.

By offering a range of financial incentives, such as free balance transfers or interest free periods, a company may hope to attract new customers. This is superficially attractive to companies if it meets acquisition and competitive switching targets. In practice, however, a serial switcher will not contribute any profit if he/she does not stay long enough to provide a return on investments. The lesson is that lack of integration and analysis across the business allows bad decisions to be made.

== See also ==
- Boycott – Voluntary abstention on consuming a product
- Consumerism – Acquisition of goods beyond essential needs
- Customer experience – Interaction between an organization and a customer
- Energy customer switching
- Push–pull strategy – Business terminology
- Vendor lock-in – Switching costs inhibiting a change of vendor
