= United Kingdom parliamentary second jobs controversy =

2021 controversy in British politics

The United Kingdom parliamentary second jobs controversy of 2021 began with Owen Paterson and his lobbying and breach of Commons advocacy rules, which led to his resignation on 5 November. It was in turn followed by extensive press coverage and debate about the second jobs of other MPs, particularly Geoffrey Cox. Cox, a former Attorney General, registered a total income of £970,000 in 2020, for 705 hours of legal services. An opinion piece in The Telegraph describes how Cox has always disclosed his earnings and that his constituents re-elect him with "ever increasing majorities every time his name appears on the ballot paper". According to The Guardian, the register of MPs' interests shows that more than 90 Conservative MPs undertake paid work in addition to their job in parliament, along with three Labour MPs. According to the BBC, "more than 200 MPs received earnings in the last year on top of their £81,932 annual salary. The extra earnings range from £50 a year to almost £1m."
