= Customer engineer =

Support workers who provide a service to customers

A customer engineer (CE) is a worker whose primary job scope is to provide a service to customers who have signed a contract with the company. Originally, the term was used by IBM, but now customer engineer is also being used by other companies.

== IBM customer engineer ==
Originally simply engineer, those who specialized in servicing IBM equipment in use by its customers were designated customer engineers by Tom Watson circa 1942.

Based on the requirements, an IBM CE could be a Field CE and service many customers around a defined territory, e.g.: Kuala Lumpur, or they could be based at the place of business of a particularly large customer and service only that one customer e.g.: Tenaga Nasional.

== NCR customer engineer ==
The title of CE or customer engineer is used by National Cash Register (NCR) to designate specially trained personnel who are charged with the installation, maintenance and repair of equipment and systems according to contracts with end users. They can be charged with service of either point of sales (POS) systems or with ATM machines.
