= Revenue stream =

Any of the channels of revenue of an organization or economy

A revenue stream is a source (or category of sources) of revenue of a company, other organization, or regional or national economy.

In business, a revenue stream is generally made up of either recurring revenue, transaction-based revenue, project revenue, or service revenue. In government, the term revenue stream often refers to different types of taxes.

== Recurring revenue ==
Recurring revenue is revenue that is likely to continue to be generated regularly for a significant period of time. It is typically used by companies that sell subscriptions or services. It could take the form of bills paid monthly by consumers, or commercial contracts lasting several years. An example of this is monthly phone contracts. Unless the contract is broken or the customer does not pay, the phone business is guaranteed monthly revenue for the duration of the contract, often 2 years.

Recurring revenue is often tracked on either a monthly basis, as monthly recurring revenue (MRR), or an annual basis, as annual recurring revenue (ARR). This number excludes all one-time, non-recurring payments; for instance, implementation or professional service fees, hardware, and discounts.

MRR allows subscription and service business owners to develop development strategies. Sales managers - to build quarterly and annual plans. For marketers to think through promotions, plan loyalty programs, marketing strategies and channels. The MRR indicator is important for analysts: these specialists determine which areas of the company should be improved, which should be abandoned, where to invest money. To do this, they analyze a lot of data, including regular monthly income.

MRR Calculation Formula: MRR = average monthly client payment × number of clients

== Transaction based revenue ==
These revenues are based on predictable sales of goods. Revenue is earned by a transaction from a customer. A customer in a clothing store, buying a new jacket, generates a transaction based revenue. This type of revenue is often considered less attractive than the recurring model because an action is required to attract customers.

== Project revenue ==
These are revenues generated through one time projects. Companies that rely entirely or largely need to invest a lot of effort into maintaining customer relationships. In this type of model, revenue is hard to predict, because it is hard to know what lies further down the road.

== Service revenue ==
This revenue model sells the time of oneself or of a company's employees. The service revenue model is often used in combination with one of the other models. An example of service based model are consulting firms. They offer their advice and commonly charge per hour.

== Revenue generation ==
The Business Model Canvas lists 7 ways of generating revenue: asset sales, usage fees, subscription fees, lending/leasing/renting, licensing, brokerage fees, and advertising.

=== Asset sale ===
An asset sale is completed when the buyer acquires the assets dropped by a company. An example of an asset sale is when a shoe store sells a pair of shoes to a customer. By doing this, the shoe shop sells the ownership rights to the buyer, giving him complete freedom over what to do with the pair of shoes. This type of revenue belongs to the transaction based revenue.

=== Subscription fees ===
A company sells the repeated access to a product or a service. Mobile phone companies for example, generally sell their phone service through a monthly subscription plan. This model was pioneered by magazines and newspapers. This model is desirable because often a contract binds the customer to pay for the offered product or service. This means, a company can make a much more precise revenue forecast. This revenue stream belongs to the recurring revenue model.

=== Lending / leasing / renting ===
This sort of revenue is made by giving someone access to an asset, which can be a product or a service. The key difference to a subscription fee is that this asset still belongs to the company. Common examples include car rentals or hardware leasing. This revenue stream also belongs to the recurring revenue model.

The above-mentioned are only some of the most popular revenue streams. With the growth of the internet, companies are beginning to look for new internet-based revenue streams.

== Examples ==
=== Food service ===
An example of how businesses are managing to create new revenue streams without substantial capital investment, can be found in gastronomy. Restaurant managers and planners are beginning to offer multiple lines of service as opposed to opening new restaurants. One of these services is catering. Offering a catering service does not require the huge amount of investment, whereas opening a new restaurant does. Also catering attracts an entirely new customer base. This allows restaurants to increase the number of revenue streams without needing large investments.

== See also ==
- Business Model Canvas
- List of companies by revenue
- Net revenue
- Pricing mechanism
- Revenue assurance
- Customer churn
- Product/market fit
