= Artificial intelligence in industry =

Industrial artificial intelligence, or industrial AI, refers to the application of artificial intelligence to industrial business processes. Unlike general artificial intelligence which is a frontier research discipline to build computerized systems that perform tasks requiring human intelligence, industrial AI is more concerned with the application of such technologies to address industrial pain-points for customer value creation, productivity improvement, cost reduction, site optimization, predictive analysis and insight discovery.

Artificial intelligence and machine learning have become key enablers to leverage data in production in recent years due to a number of different factors: More affordable sensors and the automated process of data acquisition; More powerful computation capability of computers to perform more complex tasks at a faster speed with lower cost; Faster connectivity infrastructure and more accessible cloud services for data management and computing power outsourcing.

== Categories ==
Possible applications of industrial AI and machine learning in the production domain can be divided into seven application areas:

- Market and trend analysis
- Machinery and equipment
- Intralogistics
- Production process
- Supply chain
- Building
- Product

Each application area can be further divided into specific application scenarios that describe concrete AI/ML scenarios in production. While some application areas have a direct connection to production processes, others cover production adjacent fields like logistics or the factory building. Predictive and preventive maintenance through data-driven machine learning are application scenarios from the Machinery & Equipment application area.

== Challenges ==
In real-world production processes, data is recorded using sensors and processed on computational entities and, if desired, actions and decisions are translated back into the physical world via actuators or by human operators.

Production data comprises different modalities, semantics and quality, and production systems are dynamic, uncertain and complex. Engineering and manufacturing problems are data-rich but information-sparse. Due to the variety of use cases and data characteristics, problem-specific data sets are required, which are difficult to acquire, hindering both practitioners and academic researchers in this domain.

== Standard processes for data science in production ==
The development of ML applications – starting with the identification and selection of the use case and ending with the deployment and maintenance of the application – follows dedicated phases that can be organized in standard process models. The process models assist in structuring the development process and defining requirements that must be met in each phase to enter the next phase. The standard processes can be classified into generic and domain-specific ones. Generic standard processes (e.g., CRISP-DM, ASUM-DM, or knowledge discovery in databases (KDD)) describe a generally valid methodology and are thus independent of individual domains.

The Machine Learning Pipeline in Production is a domain-specific data science methodology that is inspired by the CRISP-DM model and was specifically designed to be applied in fields of engineering and production technology.

== Industrial data sources ==
The foundation of most artificial intelligence and machine learning applications in industrial settings are comprehensive datasets from the respective fields. Those datasets act as the basis for training the employed models. In other domains, like computer vision, speech recognition or language models, extensive reference datasets (e.g. ImageNet, Librispeech,
