= Semma (disambiguation) =

Semma may refer to:

- Semma, a 2018 Indian Tamil language action comedy film
- Semma, an Indian restaurant in New York City specializing in South Indian cuisine

SEMMA may refer to:

- SEMMA, an acronym that stands for "Sample, Explore, Modify, Model, and Assess", in applied data mining
- UN/LOCODE:SEMMA, the UN/LOCODE geographic code of Malmö, a city in Sweden

== See also ==
- Semma Julissa (Julissa) Villanueva Barahona (born 12 May 1972), Honduran public servant
