= Revolution Analytics =

Statistical software company

- Type: Subsidiary
- Industry: Statistical software
- Predecessor: Revolution Computing
- Founded: 2007
- Headquarters: Mountain View, CA, United States
- Key people: David Rich, CEO
- Products: Revolution R
- Revenue: 8-11 Million in 2009
- Owner: Microsoft
- Parent: Microsoft
- Website: revolutionanalytics.com

Revolution Analytics (formerly REvolution Computing) is a statistical software company focused on developing open source and "open-core" versions of the free and open source software R for enterprise, academic and analytics customers. Revolution Analytics was founded in 2007 as REvolution Computing providing support and services for R in a model similar to Red Hat's approach with Linux in the 1990s as well as bolt-on additions for parallel processing. In 2009 the company received nine million in venture capital from Intel along with a private equity firm and named Norman H. Nie as their new CEO. In 2010 the company announced the name change as well as a change in focus. Their core product, Revolution R, would be offered free to academic users and their commercial software would focus on big data, large scale multiprocessor (or "high performance") computing, and multi-core functionality.

Microsoft announced on January 23, 2015, that they had reached an agreement to purchase Revolution Analytics for an as yet undisclosed amount. In 2021, Microsoft announced they would be retiring their R distribution they acquired from Revolution Analytics. In 2023, Microsoft retired the Microsoft R Application Network, which was a proprietary package hosting service similar to the Comprehensive R Archive Network for packages acquired from Revolution Analytics (like "ScaleR").

== Founding and venture capital ==
REvolution Computing was founded in New Haven, Connecticut in 2007 by Richard Schultz, Martin Schultz, Steve Weston and Kirk Mettler. At the time Martin Schultz was also the Watson Professor of Computer Science at Yale University. Adding parallel computing to R allowed the company to net large gains in speed for many common analytics operations and early clients like Pfizer took advantage of REvolution R to see large performance gains using R on computing clusters. While the improvements to core R were released under the GNU General Public License (GPL), REvolution provides support and services to customers of their commercial product and had considerable early success with life sciences and pharmaceutical companies. A year later the company opened an additional office in Seattle.

In 2009 REvolution Computing accepted nine million dollars in venture capital from Intel and North Bridge Venture Partners, a private equity firm. Intel had previously supported REvolution Computing with venture capital in 2008. A number of Intel employees also joined Revolution Analytics as employees or as advisors. Concurrently, the company changed their name to Revolution Analytics and invited Norman Nie, founder of SPSS, to serve as CEO. This change in management corresponded with a movement toward building a more complete set of software for commercial users; prior to 2009 Revolution had been focused on building parallel processing functionality into the then mostly single threaded R. David Rich replaced Norman Nie as CEO in February 2012.

== High performance computing, big data and the shift to analytics ==
Unlike analytics products offered by SAS Institute, R does not natively handle datasets larger than main memory. In 2010 Revolution Analytics introduced ScaleR, a package for Revolution R Enterprise designed to handle big data through a high-performance disk-based data store called XDF (not related to IBM's Extensible Data Format) and high performance computing across large clusters. The release of ScaleR marked a push away from consulting and services alone to custom code and a la carte package pricing. ScaleR also works with Apache Hadoop and other distributed file systems and Revolution Analytics has partnered with IBM to further integrate Hadoop into Revolution R. Packages to integrate Hadoop and MapReduce into open source R can also be found on the community package repository, CRAN.

== Market position ==
In comparison to developers of similar analytics tools, Revolution Analytics is a small company; in 2010 the company had a projected revenue of $8–11 million, but no official records of revenue or profit were published in their projections. According to Nie, the increased use of R - a fully fledged programming language, in contrast to other analytics packages - within academia is helping the company to grow quickly. Community vice president David Smith suggested that movement away from "black box" analytics toward open source tools in general supported vendors like Revolution over solely proprietary tools.

== Products ==
Revolution Analytics' product Revolution R is available in three editions. Revolution R Open is a free and open source distribution of R with additional features for performance and reproducibility. Revolution R Plus provides technical support and open-source assurance (legal indemnification) subscriptions for Revolution R Open and other open-source components that work with R. (These products were first announced October 15, 2014.) Revolution R Enterprise adds proprietary components to support statistical analysis of Big Data, and is sold as subscriptions for workstations, servers, Hadoop and databases. (Single-user licenses are available free for academic users as well as users competing in Kaggle data mining competitions.)

In January 2015 Microsoft rebranded and renewed several Revolution Analytics products and offerings for Hadoop, Teradata Database, SUSE Linux, Red Hat, and Microsoft Windows. Microsoft made several of these R-based products free of charge for developers - these products included:

- Microsoft R Server which was previously called Revolution R Enterprise for Hadoop, Linux and Teradata and included new Microsoft enterprise support and purchasing options. Microsoft R Server was further made available to students through the Microsoft DreamSpark programme.
- Microsoft R Server Developer Edition a free version for developers that with a feature set akin to the commercial edition.
- Microsoft Data Science Virtual Machine an analytics tool developed by the Revolution Analytics division premiered in January 2015.
- Microsoft R Open a rebranded version of Revolution R Open.

== See also ==
- Business models for open-source software
