= Rexer's Annual Data Miner Survey =

Survey of data science professionals

Rexer Analytics’s Annual Data Miner Survey is the largest survey of data mining, data science, and analytics professionals in the industry. It consists of approximately 50 multiple choice and open-ended questions that cover seven general areas of data mining science and practice: (1) Field and goals, (2) Algorithms, (3) Models, (4) Tools (software packages used), (5) Technology, (6) Challenges, and (7) Future. It is conducted as a service (without corporate sponsorship) to the data mining community, and the results are usually announced at the PAW (Predictive Analytics World) conferences and shared via freely available summary reports. In the 2013 survey, 1259 data miners from 75 countries participated. After 2011, Rexer Analytics moved to a biannual schedule.

== Surveys ==
1. 2020 Survey: 579 participants from 71 countries.
2. 2017 Survey: 1,123 participants from 91 countries.
3. 2015 Survey: 1,220 participants from 72 countries.
4. 2013 Survey: 68-item survey; 1,259 participants from 75 countries.
5. 2011 Survey: 52-item survey; 1,319 participants from over 60 countries. Citations include:
6. 2010 Survey: 50-item survey; 735 participants from 60 countries. Citations include:
7. 2009 Survey: 40-item survey; 710 participants from 58 countries. Citations include:
8. 2008 Survey: 34-item survey; 348 participants from 44 countries. Citations include:
9. 2007 Survey: 27-item survey; 314 participants from 35 countries.

== Recent survey results ==
While the five Data Miner surveys have covered many data mining topics, the three topics that get the most attention in citations and at conference presentations are:

- Algorithms: Each year the surveys have consistently shown that decision trees, regression, and cluster analysis form a triad of core algorithms for most data miners. However, a wide variety of algorithms are being used. This is consistent with independent polls of data miners conducted by KDnuggets over the years.
- Data Mining Tools: Data miners report using an average of four software tool to conduct their analyses. Over the survey years, R has risen in popularity. In 2010 it overtook SPSS Statistics and SAS to become the tool used by the most data miners. And the 2011 survey showed that R is now being used by close to half of all data miners (47%). STATISTICA has also grown in popularity. From 2007-2009 more data miners indicated that SPSS Clementine (now IBM SPSS Modeler) was their primary data mining tool than any other tool. However, in 2010 and 2011, STATISTICA was cited most frequently as data miners' primary tool. In terms of satisfaction with their tools, in the past few years, STATISTICA, SPSS Modeler, R, KNIME, RapidMiner and Salford Systems have received the strongest satisfaction ratings from data miners in these surveys. The growing popularity of R is consistent with independent polls of data miners conducted by KDnuggets, but the KDnuggets polls show a different picture regarding the popularity of commercial data mining software. Robert Muenchen has taken a multi-faceted approach to assessing the popularity of data analysis software - an approach that includes blog post counts, Google Scholar data, listserv subscribers, use in competitions, book publications, Google PageRank, and more. His analyses are consistent with the Rexer Analytics Surveys and KDnuggets in outlining the growth of R, but Muenchen illustrates that the popularity of software is more nuanced and one's conclusions will be different depending on what measure of popularity is used. The Rexer Analytics survey summary reports include analyses of the data miners' satisfaction with 20 dimensions of their software. Haughton et al. and Nisbet have also produced reviews of data mining software.
- Challenges: Consistently across the years, dirty data, explaining data mining to others, and difficult access to data are the top challenges data miners report facing. Participants in the 2010 survey shared best practices for overcoming these challenges.
