= Dhamaka =

Dhamaka may refer to:

- Dhamaka (1980 film), a Hindi film of 1980
- Dhamaka (2020 film), an Indian Malayalam-language comedy film directed by Omar Lulu
- Dhamaka (2021 film), an Indian Hindi-language action thriller written and directed by Ram Madhvani
- Dhamaka (2022 film), an Indian Telugu-language action comedy film written and directed by Trinadha Rao Nakkina
- Dhamaka (restaurant), an Indian restaurant in New York City
- Dhamaka, an antagonist in Chacha Chaudhary (2019 TV series)

== See also ==
- Dhamkee, 1973 Indian film
- Chhota Bheem: Kung Fu Dhamaka, a 2019 Indian animated film
