= SigmaScan =

SigmaScan Pro
- Developer(s): Systat Software Inc.
- Stable release: 5.0 / 2007
- Operating system: Windows
- Type: automatic image analysis package
- License: proprietary
- Website: SYSTAT

SigmaScan Pro is an Image analysis package for scientists, engineers, and technicians that provides a method to measure distances across any object that can be photographed or scanned.

SigmaScan was originally developed by Jandel Scientific Software in the late 1980s which was later acquired by SPSS Inc. in October 1996.

In January 2004, SYSTAT Software further acquired the exclusive worldwide rights from SPSS Inc. Systat Software is now based in San Jose, California.
