= National Asian American Survey =

American nonpartisan organization

Logo of the National Asian American Survey

National Asian American Survey is a nonpartisan organization that conducts representative surveys of the political and social preferences of the Asian American and Pacific Islander population in the United States.

Professor Karthick Ramakrishnan of University of California, Berkeley serves as the director, and principal investigators include Professor Jennifer Lee of Columbia University, Professor Taeku Lee of University of California, Berkeley, and Professor Janelle Wong University of Maryland, College Park.

== Surveys ==
=== 2008 National Asian American Survey ===
The 2008 survey polled 5,159 Asian Americans between August and October 2008, in English and 7 Asian languages, and reported data on Chinese Americans, Filipino Americans, Indian Americans, Japanese Americans, Korean Americans, and Vietnamese Americans. Most of the questions related to partisanship, political participation, and civic participation.

=== 2012 National Asian American Survey ===
The 2012 survey polled 4,269 Asian Americans and 486 Pacific Islanders between July and October 2012, in English and 10 Asian languages, and reported data on Chinese Americans, Filipino Americans, Hmong Americans, Indian Americans, Japanese Americans, Korean Americans, Pacific Islanders, and Vietnamese Americans. Questions included partisanship, political participation, and opinions on specific policy issues including immigration policy and the budget deficit. Among other things, the respondents were strong supporters of the Affordable Care act, and visa backlogs were a significant concern among Asian American voters.

== Academic publications ==
Findings from the National Asian American Survey have been published in the following:

- Wong, Janelle, et al. Asian American political participation: Emerging constituents and their political identities. Russell Sage Foundation, 2011.
- Junn, Jane, Taeku Lee, S. Karthick Ramakrishnan, and Janelle Wong. "Asian‐American Public Opinion." (2011).

Findings from the National Asian American Survey have been used and interpreted in the following:

- Hajnal, Zoltan L., and Taeku Lee. Why Americans don't join the party: Race, immigration, and the failure (of political parties) to engage the electorate. Princeton University Press, 2011.
- Ramakrishnan, S. Karthick, Janelle Wong, Taeku Lee, and Jane Junn. "Race-Based Considerations and the Obama Vote." Du Bois Review: Social Science Research on Race 6, no. 01 (2009): 219-238.
