= Daniel Tzvetkoff =

Australian entrepreneur

Daniel Tzvetkoff is an Australian entrepreneur, CEO and founder of Stacked Farm, an agricultural technology company specialising in automated vertical farming.

== Career ==
Daniel Tzvetkoff started his career in technology and software development.

In 2016, together with Liz Tzvetkoff he founded Stacked Farm in Queensland, Australia. The company focuses on fully automated vertical farming, utilizing controlled indoor environments to produce herbs and leafy greens. Under his leadership, Stacked Farm has expanded its operations, establishing a research and development facility and constructing commercial-scale farms in Australia. He also was a Chief Architect of the company's facilities, including its research and development site in Burleigh Heads and its larger-scale facility in Arundel, which serves as the company's headquarters, includes an automated farming system, corporate offices, and research and manufacturing spaces. Spanning over 6,500 square meters, it is designed to produce more than 400 tonnes of leafy greens and herbs annually.
