= E. Samantha Cheng =

Chinese American documentary maker and journalist

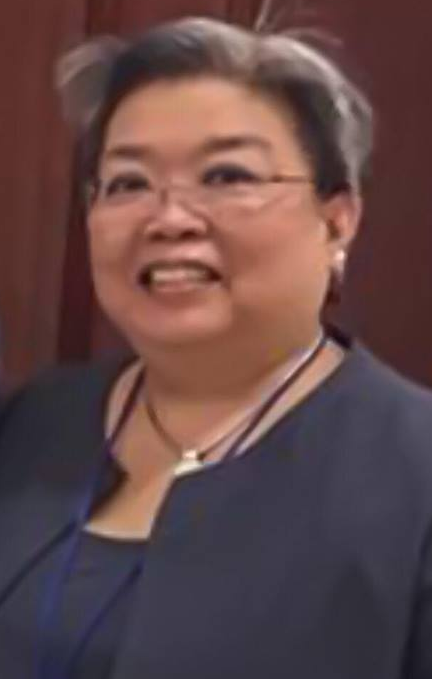
- Occupations: Journalist, writer, documentary filmmaker

E. Samantha Cheng is a Chinese-American journalist, author, and documentarian. She is best known for leading and advancing the "Chinese American WWII Veterans Recognition Project" which ultimately led to the passage of the "Chinese-American World War II Veteran Congressional Gold Medal Act" in 2018. She also cofounded the company Heritage Series, LLC, which creates educational material highlighting ethnic minorities in the United States. Cheng has led a team of collaborators in an effort to document the service of every Chinese American WWII servicemember, identifying over 22,000 Chinese American veterans in the process.

In 2006, Cheng directed the documentary Asian Pacific American Members of Congress History Project: Norman Mineta, which focused on Senator Hiram Fong. In 2010, Cheng directed the 13-minute documentary Norman Y. Mineta: A Boy from San Jose, which was shown during a reception at the National Portrait Gallery where Mineta's portrait was accepted into the National Portrait Gallery's permanent collections. From 2013 to 2021, Cheng's company Heritage Series, LLC sponsored the "APA Legacy Campaigns," which highlighted various notable Asian Americans and their contributed to the United States. Cheng directed the 2014 documentary Dalip Singh Saund: His Life, His Legacy, which a part of the Asian Pacific American Members of Congress History Project. The Motion Picture Association of America had a special screening of Dalip Singh Saund: His Life, His Legacy on May 8, 2014. Cheng's Honor and Duty: The Mississippi Delta Chinese documentary premiered in Jackson, Mississippi, on April 28, 2016, and was later broadcast nationally on PBS.

Starting in December 2016, Cheng led the Chinese American Citizens Alliance (CACA) to advocate U.S. members of congress to pass the "Chinese-American World War II Veteran Congressional Gold Medal Act," also known as Public Law 115-337. In addition to the act, Cheng was the director of the "Chinese American WWII Veterans Recognition Project," which was a campaign aimed to create a public database of all Chinese-Americans who served in the United States Armed Forces during World War II. The "Chinese-American World War II Veteran Congressional Gold Medal Act" was passed and signed by President Donald Trump on December 20, 2018.

On October 30, 2020, Cheng appeared on a panel discussion broadcast on C-SPAN and hosted by the National World War II Museum about the efforts to document Chinese Americans WWII Veterans. Her book Honor and Duty: The Chinese American WWII Veterans was published November 11, 2020. The book was the topic of a Chinese American Museum Webinar panel that included Cheng, Commander Fang Wong, Navy Commander Evelyn Moy, and Janelle Wong on November 10, 2020.

Cheng is a member of the Asian American Journalists Association (AAJA) and has participated in its mentorship program as a mentor. In 2020, she has donated to the Wing Luke Museum and the American Legion Auxiliary.

== External Resources ==
- Heritage Series Official Website
- November 26, 2020 Podcast Interview with Cheng by Ken Fong for the Asian American Podcast
