= SPSS Inc. =

Chicago statistical software company acquired by IBM for $1.2 billion in 2009

- Type: Public
- Industry: Software
- Founded: 1968
- Founder: Norman Nie, Dale Bent, Hadlai "Tex" Hull
- Defunct: 2010
- Fate: Acquired by IBM
- Headquarters: Chicago, Illinois
- Products: Statistical software
- Parent: IBM

SPSS Inc. was a software company headquartered in Chicago, Illinois, and incorporated in Delaware, best known for the SPSS statistical analysis software suite. The company was founded in 1968 by Norman Nie, Dale Bent and Hadlai "Tex" Hull, incorporated in 1975, and acquired by IBM in 2009 for $1.2 billion.

== History ==
The SPSS software was first developed in 1968 by Nie, Bent and Hull as the Statistical Package for the Social Sciences. The company was formally incorporated in 1975, with Nie as CEO until 1992. Jack Noonan succeeded him as CEO and led the company until the IBM acquisition in 2009.

By 2008, SPSS Inc. had revenues of US$302.9 million and reported over 250,000 customers. Beyond its flagship SPSS statistics package, the company sold a range of software for market research, survey research and statistical analysis, including:

- AMOS — structural equation modelling software (acquired from SmallWaters Corp around 2003)
- SamplePower — statistical power analysis
- AnswerTree — decision tree software for market segmentation
- SPSS Text Analysis for Surveys — for coding open-ended survey responses
- Quantum — cross-tabulation
- SPSS Modeler (formerly Clementine or PASW Modeler) — data mining
- mrInterview — CATI and online survey software

The company maintained partnerships with Oracle Corporation and participated in US government programmes. In 2004, SPSS Inc. faced a securities lawsuit alleging artificial inflation of its stock price.

== IBM acquisition ==
On 28 July 2009, IBM announced it was acquiring SPSS Inc. for US$1.2 billion in cash. In January 2010, the company became "SPSS: An IBM Company". The complete transfer of business to IBM was finalised on 1 October 2010, after which SPSS: An IBM Company ceased to exist as a separate entity. IBM SPSS is now integrated within IBM's Business Analytics Portfolio alongside IBM Algorithmics, IBM Cognos and IBM OpenPages.
