= Rexer =

Rexer may refer to:

- Ernst Rexer (1902–1983), a German nuclear physicist
- Fred Rexer, a U.S. Army Vietnam combat veteran and Hollywood actor and screenwriter
- Rexer Ltd., an automobile manufacturing company in Estonia
- Rexer's Annual Data Miner Survey
- The British copy of the Madsen machine gun
