= Fuselage Innovations =

- Type: Private
- Industry: Agricultural technology
- Founded: 2020
- Founders: Devan Chandrasekharan; Devika Chandrasekharan
- Headquarters: Alappuzha, Kerala, India
- Products: Agricultural drones
- Website: fuselage.co.in

Fuselage Innovations is an Indian agricultural technology company based in Kerala. Founded in 2020 by Devan Chandrasekharan and Devika Chandrasekharan, it develops unmanned aerial vehicles (UAVs) for agricultural surveying, crop monitoring and pesticide spraying. In 2025, the company received the National Aspire Award in the Building from the Heart of India category at the Government of India's National Startup Awards.

== History ==
Fuselage Innovations was established in 2020 by siblings Devan and Devika Chandrasekharan. The founders began developing agricultural drone technology after observing the effects of the 2018 Kerala floods on farming in the state. The company initially focused on using drones for agricultural surveying and crop spraying.

In 2022, the company participated in a project supported by the United Nations Development Programme (UNDP) involving the use of drones in agriculture. Its work included aerial crop surveys and agricultural spraying services.

By 2023, Fuselage had expanded its agricultural drone services to five Indian states. Its operations included crop monitoring, surveying and spraying, with services provided to farmers and agricultural organizations.

In June 2023, the company was selected for the United Kingdom's Global Entrepreneurship Programme, which provides support to businesses seeking to establish or expand operations in the country.

In December 2024, Fuselage participated in the Slush startup event in Helsinki as part of an India–Finland business delegation.

By 2025, the company had expanded from providing drone-based agricultural services into drone manufacturing. It also began developing unmanned systems for applications outside agriculture.

== Products and operations ==
Fuselage Innovations makes agricultural drones for surveying farmland, monitoring crops and applying fertilisers and pesticides. The drones can also collect aerial data. Fuselage began by offering drone services to farmers and agricultural organisations before moving into manufacturing.

A 2025 NITI Aayog case study examined the company's use of drones to map farmland and collect agricultural data.

== Recognition ==
In 2025, Fuselage co-founder Devan Chandrasekharan was named to the Forbes India 30 Under 30 list for his work in agricultural drone technology.

The company also won the national Aspire Award in the Building from the Heart of India category at the 2025 National Startup Awards, held under the government's Startup India initiative.
