= Domain-driven data mining =

Domain-driven data mining is a data mining methodology for discovering actionable knowledge and deliver actionable insights from complex data and behaviors in a complex environment. It studies the corresponding foundations, frameworks, algorithms, models, architectures, and evaluation systems for actionable knowledge discovery.

Data-driven pattern mining and knowledge discovery in databases face such challenges that the discovered outputs are often not actionable. In the era of big data, how to effectively discover actionable insights from complex data and environment is critical. A significant paradigm shift is the evolution from data-driven pattern mining to domain-driven actionable knowledge discovery. Domain-driven data mining is to enable the discovery and delivery of actionable knowledge and actionable insights.

-driven data mining has attracted significant attention from both academic and industry. There was a workshop series on domain-driven data mining during 2007-2014 with the IEEE International Conference on Data Mining and a special issue published by the IEEE Transactions on Knowledge and Data Engineering. There are also various new research problems and challenges in the last decade, where the incorporation of domain knowledge into data mining processes and models, such as deep neural networks, graph embedding, text mining, and reinforcement learning, is critically important.

== Actionable knowledge ==
Actionable knowledge refers to the knowledge that can inform decision-making actions and be converted to decision-making actions. The actionability of data mining and machine learning findings, also called knowledge actionability, refers to the satisfaction of both technical (statistical) and business-oriented evaluation metrics or measures in terms of objective and/or subjective perspectives. The research and innovation on actionable knowledge discovery can be deemed a paradigm shift from knowledge discovery from data to actionable knowledge discovery and delivery by mining complex data for complex knowledge in either a multi-feature, multi-source, or multi-method scenario.

== Actionable insight ==
Actionable insight enables accurate and in-depth understanding of things or objects and their characteristics, events, stories, occurrences, patterns, exceptions, and evolution and dynamics hidden in the data world and corresponding decision-making actions on top of the insights. Actionable knowledge may disclose actionable insights.
