= Vijay Kumar (chef) =

Indian Chef

- Occupation: Cook
- Awards: James Beard Foundation Award (Best Chef: New York State, 2025)

Vijay Kumar (circa 1981) is an Indian chef based in New York City. Kumar is a James Beard Award winner and was named the Best Chef for New York State in 2025. Kumar is known for his Tamil cuisine. His restaurant Semma has one Michelin star.

== Early Life and Education ==
Kumar was born circa 1981 in Natham, a town in southern Tamil Nadu. His mother worked as a farmer and she was born circa 1955. His father died in 2006. Kumar had originally wanted to pursue engineering but did not have the financial means to attend and instead chose to attend culinary school. He was 17 years old when he started. He credits his mother for sparking his interest in food.

== Career ==
After graduating from culinary school, he worked at the Taj Connemara hotel in Chennai. He then went to work on cruise ships as a chef. He later worked at the restaurant Dosa, located in San Francisco, California. In 2021, Kumar left Rasa, a Michelin-starred Indian restaurant in Burlingame, California, to open his own restaurant. Kumar worked with restauranteurs Roni Mazumdar and Chintan Pandya to open a new restaurant, Semma, located in Greenwich Village in 2021. Semma is a Tamil slang word for "fantastic." In 2022, Semma would be awarded one Michelin Star.

In 2025, Kumar was awarded the James Beard Award for the Best Chef in New York State. He wore a veshti to the award ceremony to honor his Tamil heritage. That same year, The New York Times ranked Kumar's Semma the top restaurant of 2025.

On May 1, 2026, Kumar, alongside other Gold House honorees, rang the Nasdaq's closing bell. Also in 2026, Kumar, Mazumdar, and Pandya were honorees for Observer's 2026 Nightlife & Dining Power List. La Liste awarded Kumar the "Talent of the Year Award" for 2026 as well.
