= Karthick Ramakrishnan =

American political scientist

- Education: Brown University; Princeton University
- Awards: Frederick Douglass 200
- Scientific career
- Fields: Political science; Migration studies; Demography
- Workplaces: University of California, Riverside

Subramanian Karthick Ramakrishnan, typically published as S. Karthick Ramakrishnan or Karthick Ramakrishnan, is an American political scientist, currently a professor of public policy at the University of California, Riverside. He is also a founder of AAPI Data and the UC Riverside Center for Social Innovation, and has been the Associate Dean of the School of Public Policy. He studies the political behavior and engagement of immigrants to the United States, and manages projects to gather data about minority groups in America.

== Career ==
Ramakrishnan has a BA in international relations from Brown University, and a PhD in politics from Princeton University.

Ramakrishnan has written or edited seven books, including Citizenship Reimagined: A New Framework for State Rights in the United States (2020). He was the solo author of Democracy in Immigrant America: Changing Demographics and Political Participation (2005), which Pei-te Lien called "an unprecedented effort systematically to study political participation by immigrants and their offspring, across generations and major racial and national-origin groups". He has also published articles on topics like the integration of immigrants into American political society and public opinion regarding immigration in venues like Perspectives on Politics and the International Migration Review.

Ramakrishnan has founded and directed multiple projects related to data acquisition on minority groups in the US, including the National Asian American Survey, the AAPI Data project to collect information about Asian Americans and Pacific Islanders in the US, and the Inland Empire 2020 Census Complete Count Committee, an effort in San Bernardino County and Riverside County to raise awareness and conduct outreach to hard-to-count populations by the US Census. Ramakrishnan was also the founding editor of the Journal of Race, Ethnicity, and Politics.

Ramakrishnan's work has regularly been quoted, or had his work cited, in news outlets like NBC, Vox, the Los Angeles Times, The New York Times, and The Washington Post. He has also published articles in The Washington Post and CNN.

Ramakrishnan has served as a member of the U.S. Census Bureau's National Advisory Committee on Racial, Ethnic, and Other Populations, as chair of the California Commission on Asian and Pacific Islander American Affairs, and as President of the Association of Princeton Graduate Alumni. In 2018, Ramakrishnan was named a member of the Frederick Douglass 200, a project by American University and the Frederick Douglass Family Initiatives to select "200 living individuals who best embody the work and spirit of Douglass".

== Selected works ==
- "Immigrant Incorporation and Political Participation in the United States", International Migration Review, with Thomas J. Espenshade (2001)
- Democracy in Immigrant America: Changing Demographics and Political Participation (2005)
- “Second‐Generation Immigrants? The “2.5 Generation” in the United States,” Social Science Quarterly (2004)
- Asian American Political Participation: Emerging Constituents and Their Political Identities, with Janelle Wong, Taeku Lee, and Jane Junn (2011)
- The New Immigration Federalism, with Pratheepan Gulasekaram (2015)
- Framing Immigrants: News Coverage, Public Opinion, and Policy, with Chris Haynes and Jennifer Merolla (2016)
- Citizenship Reimagined: A New Framework for State Rights in the United States, with Allan Colbern (2020).

== Selected awards ==
- Frederick Douglass 200 (2018)
