= Stacked Farm =

Australian agricultural technology company

- Type: Private
- Industry: Agricultural technology
- Founded: 2016
- Headquarters: Arundel, Queensland, Australia
- Area served: Australia, United States
- Key people: Daniel Tzvetkoff (CEO, founder); Sam Canavan (COO)
- Website: https://stackedfarm.com/

Stacked Farm is an Australian agricultural technology company specializing in automated vertical farming. The company was founded in 2016 in Queensland, Australia by Liz and Daniel Tzvetkoff. Stacked Farm operates automated vertical farms, focusing on the production of herbs and leafy greens. Stacked Farm also operates the Beyond Organic brand.

== History ==
Stacked Farm was founded in late 2016 by Liz and Daniel Tzvetkoff, initially operating from a 400-square-metre (4,300 sq ft) research and development facility in Burleigh Heads, Gold Coast, Queensland. The Burleigh Heads facility closed in 2021 as Stacked Farm relocated to a larger site in Arundel, Queensland.

Construction of the Arundel campus began in 2021. The site includes an automated robotic vertical farm, head office, assembly and construction space, and a research and development facility. It spans 6,588 square metres (70,910 sq ft) , with 2,144 square metres (23,080 sq ft) dedicated to farming. The vertical farm is designed to produce over 400 tonnes of herbs and leafy greens annually. Commissioning of the facility began in late 2023, and the first harvest was completed in January 2024. Stacked Farm has received investments from institutional entities Magnetar Capital and Tribeca Capital. Strategic supply chain investors include Morco Fresh, Tayside Investments (PFD Food Services), and PMFresh.

In 2023, Stacked Farm was ranked third in the Australian Financial Review Most Innovative Companies list in the Agriculture, Mining & Utilities category. The company was also included in the FoodTech 500 top list for 2024.

In January 2025, construction began on Stacked Farm’s first commercial-scale facility at the Melbourne Airport precinct. The Melbourne facility covers 10,000 square metres (110,000 sq ft). The company has also announced to expand into the US, with an office in Los Angeles, California, and additional farms in both Australia and the US.

== Operations ==
Stacked Farm operates fully automated vertical farms, focusing on the production of herbs and leafy greens. The company manufactures its own farming equipment and operates its technology in-house. The farming process is conducted in a controlled indoor environment, where crops are grown in stacked PVC trays filled with a basalt growing medium. The system incorporates a mixture of white, red, and blue LED lighting, with adjustments made to optimise plant growth, flavour, and nutrient composition. Compared to conventional farming, the system enables shorter crop cycles and requires 95% less water. Stacked Farm also operates the Beyond Organic brand. Stacked Farm's produce cultivated without pesticides, herbicides, or contaminants is marketed under the Beyond Organic brand.

The company is headquartered in Arundel, Queensland. Facilities include Arundel, Queensland (headquarters, training center, and operational farm), Melbourne, Victoria (a 10,000 sqm commercial-scale farm fully powered by green energy) and Los Angeles, California. Stacked Farm is a member of the UN Global Compact Network Australia. Daniel Tzvetkoff is CEO and founder.
