= Semma (restaurant) =

Restaurant in New York City

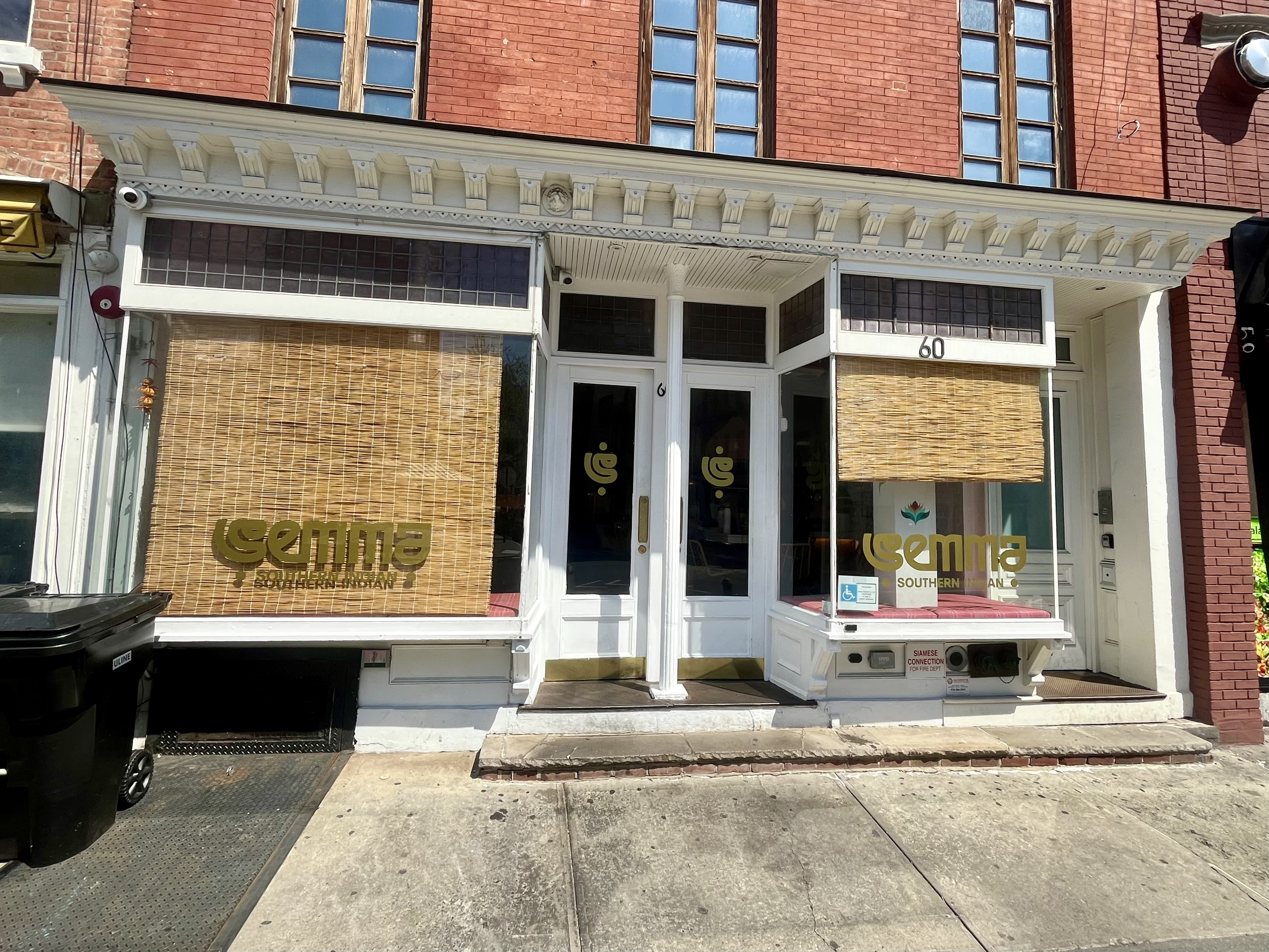
- Semma in April 2024
- Interactive map of Semma

Restaurant information
- Established: 2021
- Owners: Roni Mazumdar; Chintan Pandya
- Head chef: Vijay Kumar
- Food type: South Indian cuisine
- Rating: Michelin Guide:
- Location: 60 Greenwich Avenue, New York City, New York, 10011, United States
- Coordinates: 40°44′9.7″N 74°0′2.2″W
- Seating capacity: 79 (12 bar seats,) 85 in the summer (with patio)
- Reservations: Required outside of the bar/summer patio
- Website: semma.nyc

Semma is an Indian restaurant in New York City specializing in South Indian cuisine. The restaurant, operated by Roni Mazumdar and Chintan Pandya and their hospitality group Unapologetic Foods, replaced their first collaborative restaurant, Rahi. The restaurant received a Michelin Star in 2022, which it retained in 2023 and in 2024, it has received positive reviews from restaurant critics. Its chef Vijay Kumar won the 2025 James Beard Foundation Award for best chef in New York State.

== History and focus ==
Rahi, the restaurant which previously occupied Semma's location, closed in September 2021. Semma opened on October 12, 2021. Vijay Kumar left his position as chef at Rasa, an Indian restaurant in California, to become Executive chef/ partner at Semma. Kumar grew up in Tamil Nadu and designed the menu to focus on the foods of Southern India. Dishes on the menu, including the nathai pirattal (a snail dish) and a venison dish, were inspired by meals prepared by Kumar's family during his childhood. Semma does not list a phone number. The writers of a 2023 New York Times article about strategies to secure in-demand restaurant reservations referred to Semma as "one of the hardest-to-get-into places" in New York City.

"Semma" means "fantastic" or "super" in Tamil. Mazumdar and Kumar have both said that patrons have thanked them for providing food and flavors which accurately capture cooking found in India.

=== Design ===
The interior of the space was redone after the closure of Rahi, with a new design inspired by the Indian state of Kerala. The New York Times referred to the interior as having "tropical accents" and noted that wood ceilings "suggest" Keralan houseboats, known as kettuvallam. Semma also features a mural depicting a Kathakali dancer. The restaurant's decor was designed by Wid Chapman Architects.

== Reviews and accolades ==
=== Reviews ===
In a positive review, The New York Times critic Pete Wells compared Semma favorably to other restaurants by Unapologetic Foods. Wells praised the "rustic cooking" featured at Adda and Dhamaka, Semma's "siblings" as their primary strength, while asserting that Semma was distinguished by its "chutneys...sauces...and spices" and its more extensive offerings.

In a review published by Eater, critic Robert Sietsema praised the restaurant for "aggressively challenging New York’s long-standing ideas about the scope and depth of Indian cuisine". Sietsema highlighted the Mangalore huukkosu, mulaikattiya thaniya, and erral thoku as several of his favorite dishes.

In 2026, multiple stories of the restaurant's poor health ratings were published, reporting that the restaurant intentionally hid food contamination and hygiene issues from the public, in addition to harassment lawsuits. In July, 2026, health inspections revealed critical health and safety violations.

=== Accolades ===
The restaurant was awarded a Michelin Star in 2022, which it retained in 2023 and 2024 The Infatuation included Semma on its list of the best new restaurants in New York City in 2021. The restaurant was included on a list published by The New York Times of the restaurants "loved most" by its critics in 2022. The publication Bon Appétit included Semma on its list of the best new restaurants of 2022. Semma has been included on lists of the best Indian restaurants in New York City published by sites including Eater, Thrillist, TastingTable, and The Infatuation.

Pete Wells placed Semma in twelfth place in his 2023 ranking of the best hundred restaurants in New York City, and in seventh place on the same list for 2024. In 2025, Priya Krishna and Melissa Clark, the interim food critics at the Times after Wells's departure, ranked Semma in first place on their list. In 2025 head chef Vijay Kumar won the Best Chef in New York State award from the James Beard Foundation Awards.

== See also ==
- List of Michelin-starred restaurants in New York City
