= Dhamaka (restaurant) =

Indian restaurant in New York City

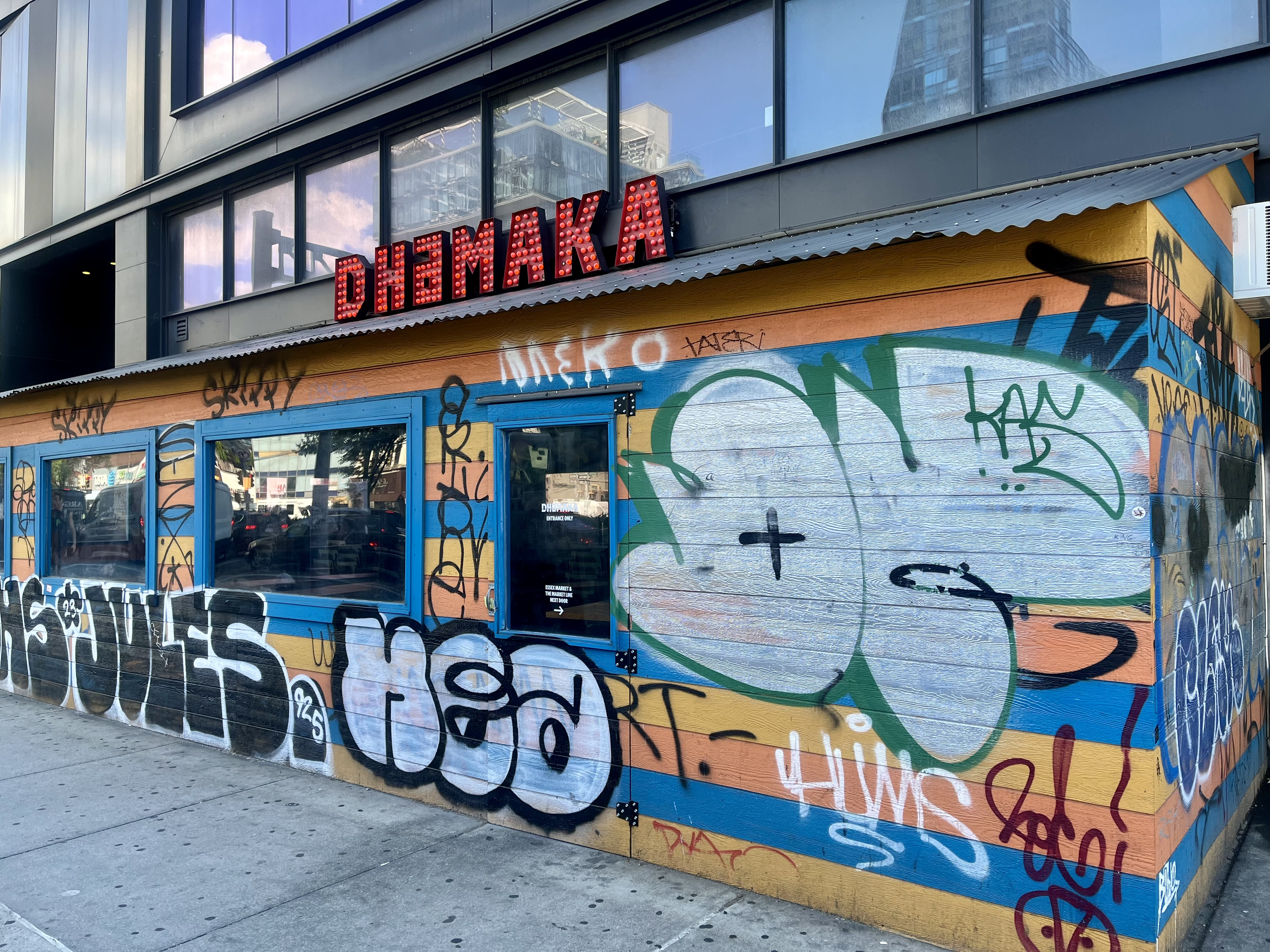
- The restaurant's exterior in 2024
- Interactive map of Dhamaka

Restaurant information
- Location: 119 Delancey Street, Manhattan, New York City, New York
- Coordinates: 40°43′6″N 73°59′17″W

Dhamaka is an Indian restaurant in New York City. The restaurant is run by Chintan Pandya and Roni Mazumdar of hospitality group Unapologetic Foods.

== History and focus ==
The restaurant's founders, Chintan Pandya and Roni Mazumdar, initially planned to open the restaurant in the summer of 2019, and announced their plans to do so in February 2019. Pandya and Mazumdar, respectively the chef and owner of Dhamaka, had previously collaborated on restaurants Rahi and Adda. The founders pushed the goal of opening in 2019 to early 2020, and later fall 2020; the restaurant ultimately opened in February 2021. The delays in 2020 were due to the COVID-19 pandemic. The restaurant is in Essex Market.

The restaurant's popularity has received coverage in the press. Richard Morgan, writing for Eater, highlighted the restaurant's Rajasthani khargosh dish, a whole rabbit, as "perhaps the most impossible-to-order dish in NYC". The restaurant serves the dish only once a night, and diners must pre-order and pre-pay for the dish.

The restaurant's founders aim to highlight regional Indian dishes rather than focusing on either northern or southern Indian foods.

The restaurant closed temporarily in April 2023 to introduce new menu items and retire others. The restaurant's Rajasthani khargosh and paneer methi will both remain on the menu.

== Reviews and accolades ==
=== Reviews ===
Pete Wells, restaurant critic for The New York Times, gave Dhamaka a positive review. Wells was unable to order the rabbit, and Richard Morgan attributed the popularity of the dish in part due to this failure. In a later review of Semma, another restaurant run by Unapologetic Foods, Wells praised the "rustic cooking" featured at Dhamaka as its primary strength, while asserting that Semma was distinguished by its "chutneys...sauces...and spices" and its more extensive offerings.

=== Accolades ===
The restaurant was nominated for the James Beard Foundation's Best New Restaurant award and Chintan Pandya was nominated for the Best Chef: New York State award in March 2022. Pandya won the award.

Pete Wells placed Dhamaka in seventy-fourth place in his 2023 ranking of the best hundred restaurants in New York City, and in fifty-fourth place on the same list for 2024.
