= SPSS Modeler =

Data analytics software

IBM SPSS Modeler

- Data mining tool
- Developer: IBM Corp.
- Stable release: 18.5 / December 2023; 2 years ago
- Written in: Clementine: POP-11, C SPSS Modeler: Java
- Operating system: Windows, Linux, Unix, macOS
- Type: data mining, predictive analytics
- License: proprietary
- Website: www.ibm.com/products/spss-modeler

IBM SPSS Modeler is a data mining and text analytics software application from IBM. It is used to build predictive models and conduct other analytic tasks. It has a visual interface which allows users to leverage statistical and data mining algorithms without programming.

One of its main aims from the outset was to eliminate needless complexity in data transformations, and make complex predictive models very easy to use.

The first version incorporated decision trees (ID3), and neural networks (backprop), which could both be trained without underlying knowledge of how those techniques worked.

IBM SPSS Modeler was originally named Clementine by its creators, Integral Solutions Limited. This name continued for a while after SPSS's acquisition of the product. SPSS later changed the name to SPSS Clementine, and then later to PASW Modeler. Following IBM's 2009 acquisition of SPSS, the product was renamed IBM SPSS Modeler, its current name. SPSS Modeler supports a wide range of analytical techniques, including classification, clustering, forecasting, and text mining, and is commonly used in business analytics, research, and decision-support systems.

== Applications ==
SPSS Modeler has been used in these and other industries:

- Customer analytics and Customer relationship management (CRM)
- Fraud detection and prevention
- Optimizing insurance claims
- Risk management
- Manufacturing quality improvement
- Healthcare quality improvement
- Forecasting demand or sales
- Law enforcement and border security
- Education
- Telecommunications
- Entertainment: e.g., predicting movie box office receipts

== Editions ==
IBM sells the version of SPSS Modeler 18.2.1 in two separate bundles of features. These two bundles are called "editions" by IBM:

- SPSS Modeler Professional: used for structured data, such as databases, mainframe data systems, flat files or BI systems
- SPSS Modeler Premium: Includes all the features of Modeler Professional, with the addition of:

– Text analytics

Both editions are available in desktop and server configurations.

In addition to the traditional IBM SPSS Modeler desktop installations, IBM now offers the SPSS Modeler interface as an option in the Watson Studio product line which includes Watson Studio (cloud), Watson Studio Local, and Watson Studio Desktop.

Watson Studio Desktop documentation: https://www.ibm.com/support/knowledgecenter/SSBFT6_1.1.0/mstmap/kc_welcome.html

== Product history ==
Early versions of the software were called Clementine and were Unix-based. The first version was released on Jun 9th 1994, after Beta testing at 6 customer sites. Clementine was originally developed by a UK company named Integral Solutions Limited (ISL), in Collaboration with artificial intelligence researchers at the University of Sussex. The original Clementine was implemented in Poplog, which ISL marketed for that University.

Clementine mainly used the Poplog languages, Pop-11, with some parts written in C for speed (such as the neural network engine), along with additional tools provided as part of Solaris, VMS and various versions of Unix. The tool quickly garnered the attention of the data mining community (at that time in its infancy).

In order to reach a larger market, ISL then Ported Poplog to Microsoft Windows using the NutCracker package, later named MKS Toolkit to provide the Unix graphical facilities. Original in many respects, Clementine was the first data mining tool to use an icon based graphical user interface rather than requiring users to write in a programming language, though that option remained available for expert users.

In 1998 ISL was acquired by SPSS Inc., who saw the potential for extended development as a commercial data mining tool. In early 2000, the software was developed into a client–server model architecture, and shortly afterward, the client front-end interface component was rewritten fully and replaced with a new Java front-end, which allowed deeper integration with the other tools provided by SPSS.

SPSS Clementine version 7.0: The client front-end runs under Windows. The server back-end Unix variants (SunOS, HP-UX, AIX), Linux, and Windows. The graphical user interface is written in Java.

IBM SPSS Modeler 14.0 was the first release of Modeler by IBM.

IBM SPSS Modeler 15, released in June 2012, introduced significant new functions for social network analysis and entity analytics.

== See also ==
- IBM SPSS Statistics
- List of statistical packages
- Cross Industry Standard Process for Data Mining
