= Janelle Wong =

American political scientist

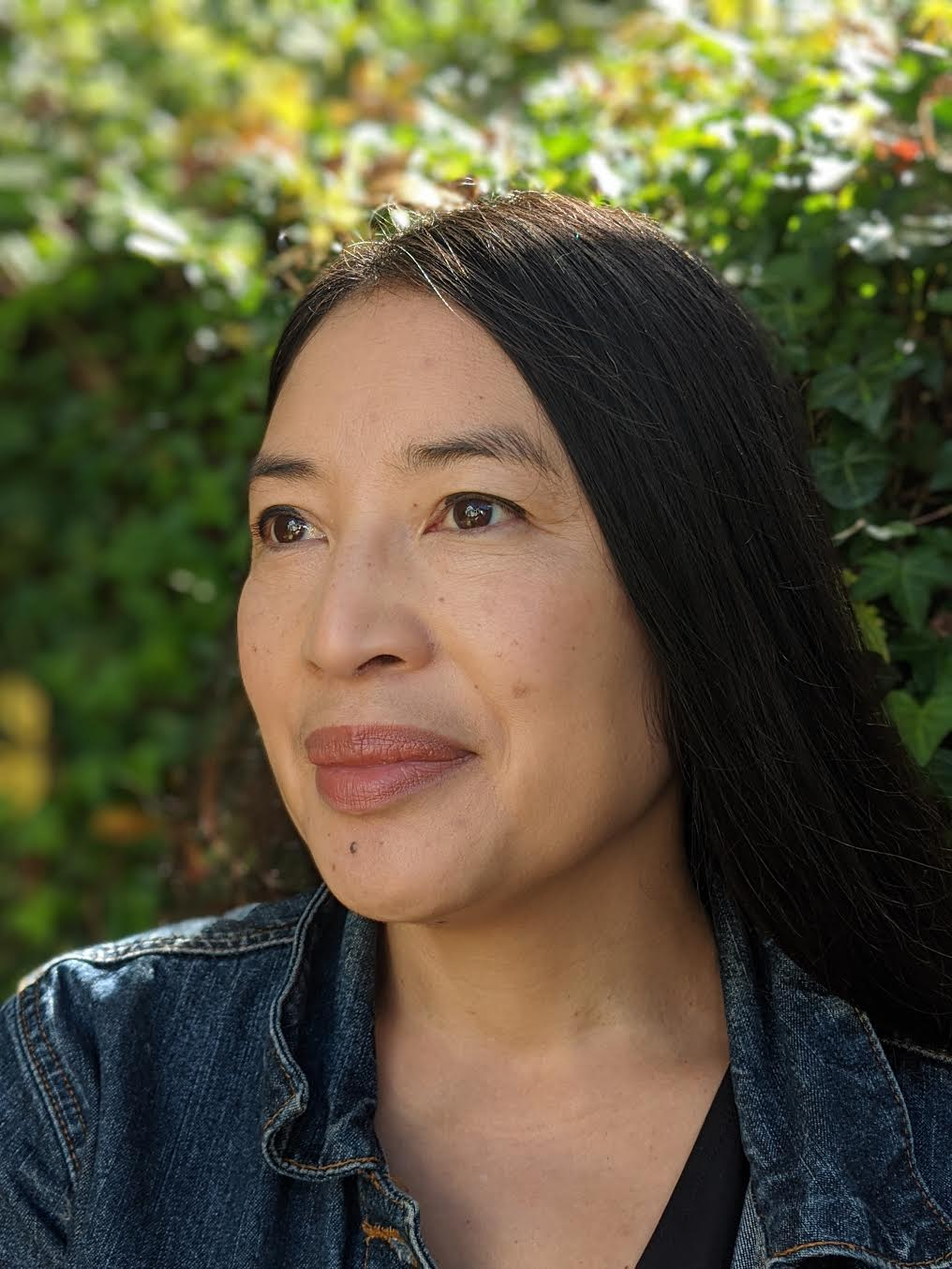
- Born: Yuba City, California, U.S.

Academic background
- Education: University of California, Los Angeles (BA); Yale University (MA, PhD)
- Thesis: The new dynamics of immigrants' political incorporation: a multi-method study of political participation and mobilization among Asian and Latino immigrants in the United States (2001)

Janelle Staci Wong is an American political scientist. She is a Professor of American Studies, Government and Politics, and core faculty member in the Asian American Studies Program at the University of Maryland, College Park.

== Early life and education ==
Wong was born and raised in Yuba City, California in the 1970s. She attended Gray Avenue Middle School and Yuba City High School. Following high school graduation, Wong attended the University of California, Los Angeles during a time of deep racial divides in the state. After receiving her Bachelor of Arts degree in political science, she enrolled at Yale University for her Master's degree and PhD.

== Career ==
Upon receiving her PhD in 2001, Wong joined the faculty at the University of Southern California (USC) as an associate professor with a joint appointment in political science and American studies and ethnicity. During her tenure at the institution, she published her first book titled Democracy’s Promise: Immigrants and American Civic Institutions through the University of Michigan Press. Following this, she was one of 23 scholars named a 2006 Woodrow Wilson Center Fellow in recognition of her "work on how immigrants are changing the face of the religious right."

Prior to leaving USC in 2012, Wong co-authored a second book titled Asian American Political Participation: Emerging Constituents and their Political Identities through the Russell Sage Foundation. The book was the published results of a national survey conducted on over 5,000 Asian Americans regarding their political participation. They questioned why Asians with high socioeconomic status were less inclined to participate in politics such as voting or donating. Following the book's publication, Wong left USC to become the new Director of the Asian American Studies Program at the University of Maryland, College Park.

In her role as Director of the Asian American Studies Program, Wong collaborated with three other University of California professors to conduct the 2016 National Asian American Survey. Using their $500,000 National Science Foundation grant, the goal of the research was to study different aspects of the Asian American experience before the 2016 United States presidential election. She also sat on the Association for Asian American Studies Board for a one-year term between 2015 and 2016. Two year later, Wong published her third book titled Immigrants, Evangelicals and Politics in an Era of Demographic Change through the Russell Sage Foundation. Wong has been a vocal advocate for race-conscious admissions, co-authoring briefs supporting affirmative action in college and university admissions and publishing a number essays on the topic in mainstream media outlets. In 2024 she was elected to the American Academy of Political and Social Sciences as the W.E.B. Du Bois Fellow. In 2026, she was elected to the American Academy of Arts and Sciences (Political Science).

== Selected publications ==
- Immigrants, Evangelicals and Politics in an Era of Demographic Change (2018)
- Asian American Political Participation: Emerging Constituents and their Political Identities (2011; co-author)
- Democracy's Promise: Immigrants and American Civic Institutions (The Politics of Race and Ethnicity) (2006)
