= OpenPages =

Computer platform

- Type: Brand (of IBM)
- Industry: Governance, Risk, and Compliance; Risk Management; Compliance Management; Operational Risk Management; IT Governance; SOX Compliance; Internal Audit Management
- Founded: 1990
- Founders: Scott Killoh, Warren Ondras
- Headquarters: Waltham, United States
- Website: http://www.ibm.com/openpages

IBM OpenPages is an integrated governance, risk, and compliance (GRC) platform that enables companies to manage risk and regulatory challenges across the enterprise. The software was developed by American Computer Innovators in 1996.

== History ==
In 1996, Amherst, Massachusetts-based American Computer Innovators (ACI, a company founded May 1990) began developing an electronic publishing system for news publishers and other media companies. The software was eventually marketed as an enterprise content management system under the brand/product name OpenPages Composer. Customers at the time included dozens of news publishers around the U.S. such as The Day Publishing Company, Daily Press, Chicago Tribune, Miami Herald and many more. In August, 2000, American Computer Innovators was officially renamed Openpages, and the computer hardware sales and repair portion of the business was spun off as Amherst Computerworks in June 2001. The company was significantly restructured during 2000-2001, and under new management its offerings were marketed as Governance, Risk, and Compliance software and services sold to enterprise customers. Over the decade that followed OpenPages attracted more than 200 customers including Barclays, Duke Energy, and TIAA-CREF.

On October 21, 2010, OpenPages was officially acquired by IBM. OpenPages joins software brands Cognos and SPSS to form the Business Analytics division of the IBM Software Group. The OpenPages name continues to be applied to IBM's line of governance, risk management, and compliance products.

On November 17, 2020, IBM announced OpenPages would be included in its Cloud Pak for Data solution. IBM Cloud Pak for Data 4.0 provides an intelligent data fabric that combines and automates data and AI lifecycles, simplifying data management to accelerate digital transformation.

== Services ==
OpenPages provides a set of core services and functional components that span risk and compliance domains, which include:

- Operational Risk
- Policy Management
- Financial Controls Management
- IT Governance
- Internal Audit
- Model Risk Governance
- Regulatory Compliance Management
- Third-party Risk Management
- Business Continuity Management
- Data Privacy Management
