= Jane Junn =

American political scientist

- Education: University of Michigan; University of Chicago
- Awards: Woodrow Wilson Foundation book award; Ralph J. Bunche Award, APSA
- Scientific career
- Fields: Political science; Gender studies
- Workplaces: Rutgers University; University of Southern California

Jane Junn is an American political scientist. She is the University of Southern California Associates Chair in Social Sciences, and a professor of political science and gender studies. She studies public opinion, political behavior, and survey methodology, including work on the relationship between education and public participation, Asian American political participation, and gender and politics.

== Early work and education ==
Junn graduated from the University of Michigan in 1985 with an AB degree in political science. She then attended the University of Chicago, receiving an MA in political science in 1987 and then a PhD in political science in 1994.

In 1993, Junn joined the political science faculty at Rutgers University. She remained there until 2009, when she moved to the University of Southern California.

== Career ==
In addition to her publications in peer-reviewed journals and chapters in books, Junn has been an author or an editor of five books. Her first book, Education and Democratic Citizenship in America, was coauthored with Norman H. Nie and Kenneth Stehlik-Barry and published in 1996. The authors use data from the 1990 Citizen Participation Study to study how level of education affects political variables like engagement in American political processes. The book addresses a paradox that at the individual level, educational attainment has a very strong association with increased political engagement (as originally pointed out by Philip Converse), but as the number of educated people in the United States grew over the second half of the 20th century, there was no corresponding increase in political involvement. The authors propose and test a novel model to explain this paradox, building on previous work by Fred Hirsch. The book won the Woodrow Wilson Foundation award for the best book published in political science in 1996.

In 1998, Junn coauthored a second book about the relationship between civic engagement and education, publishing the book Civic Education: What Makes Students Learn with Richard G. Niemi. She also edited the 2008 book New Race Politics: Understanding Minority and Immigrant Politics with Kerry L. Haynie, and coauthored the 2011 book Asian American Political Participation: Emerging Constituents and their Political Identities with Janelle Wong, S. Karthick Ramakrishnan and Taeku Lee.

In 2013, Junn and Natalie Masuoka published the book The Politics of Belonging: Race, Public Opinion, and Immigration. The Politics of Belonging won the 2014 Ralph J. Bunche Award from the American Political Science Association, which "honors the best scholarly work in political science that explores the phenomenon of ethnic and cultural pluralism".

Junn has held leadership roles in several professional organizations and editorial positions at journals. She was the 2018–2019 President of the Western Political Science Association. From 2009 to 2010, she was the Vice President of the American Political Science Association, where she was also the program co-chair for the 2008 annual conference. She was also a director at the Association of American Universities for four years. From 2018–2020, she and Marisa Abrajano were the Co-Editors-in-Chief of the Journal of Race, Ethnicity, and Politics.

Junn has been quoted and her work has been cited extensively in news outlets like The Washington Post, The Atlantic, The New York Times, The Chicago Tribune, and The Globe and Mail.

== Selected works ==
- Education and Democratic Citizenship in America, with Norman H. Nie and Kenneth Stehlik-Barry (1996)
- Civic Education: What Makes Students Learn, with Richard G. Niemi (1998)
- Asian American Political Participation: Emerging Constituents and their Political Identities, with Janelle Wong, Karthick Ramakrishnan, and Taeku Lee (2011)
- The Politics of Belonging: Race, Public Opinion, and Immigration with Natalie Masuoka (2013)

== Selected awards ==
- Best book in political science award, Woodrow Wilson Foundation (1997)
- Ralph J. Bunche Award, American Political Science Association (2014)
