= Examples of data mining =

Real-world applications of data mining

Data mining, the process of discovering patterns in large data sets, has been used in many applications.

== Agriculture ==
Drone monitoring and satellite imagery are some of the methods used for enabling data collection on soil health, weather patterns, crop growth, pest activity, and other factors. Datasets are analyzed to improve agricultural efficiency, identify patterns and trends, and minimize potential losses.

- Data mining techniques can be applied to visual data in agriculture to extract meaningful patterns, trends, and associations. This information can improve algorithms that detect defects in harvested fruits and vegetables. For example, advanced visual data collection methods, machine vision systems, and image processing have been applied to classify fruits and vegetables according to numerous surface defects. Additionally, this data can be analyzed to investigate potential causes of defects. Much of this knowledge is based on anecdotal evidence rather than qualitative and quantitative data collection methods. However, efforts are being made to integrate data mining techniques into horticulture research. Before being sent to market, apples are inspected, and those with defects are removed. However, invisible defects can affect an apple's flavor and appearance. One example of such is the water core, an internal disorder that can affect the fruit's shelf life. Apples with a slight water core are sweeter, but those with a moderate to severe water core have reduced storage potential compared to regular apples. Additionally, a few fruits with severe water cores could spoil an entire batch. Because of this, a computational system is under study that captures X-ray images of the apples as they run on conveyor belts. The system analyzes the pictures using machine learning algorithms to predict the likelihood of the fruit containing water cores.
- The metabolic transformations during fermentation impact the quality of the wine produced and the productivity of wine production industries. Data science techniques, such as k-means clustering, and classification techniques based on biclustering, have been used to study these metabolic processes, successfully predicting fermentation outcomes after as little as three days. These methods allow for the classification of wine according to the metabolite profile of the fermentation, differentiating it from traditional wine classification systems.
- A Group Method of Data Handling (GMDH)-type network, combined with a genetic algorithm, was used to predict the metabolizable energy of feather meal and poultry offal meal based on protein, fat, and ash content. Data samples from published literature were collected and used to train a GMDH-type network model. This approach can predict the metabolizable energy of poultry feed samples based on their chemical content. The GMDH-type network can also accurately estimate poultry performance from dietary nutrients such as metabolizable energy, protein and amino acids.
- The early detection of animal diseases can benefit farm productivity by allowing farmers to treat and isolate affected animals as soon as symptoms appear, reducing the spread of disease. For instance, the sounds pigs make, such as coughing, can be analyzed for disease detection. A computational system is being developed to monitor and differentiate pig sounds through microphones installed on the farm.
- PCR-Single Strand Conformation Polymorphism (PCR-SSCP) was used to determine growth hormone (GH), leptin, calpain, and calpastatin polymorphism in Iranian Balochi male sheep. An artificial neural network (ANN) model was developed to predict average daily gain (ADG) in lambs using input parameters of GH, leptin, calpain, calpastatin polymorphism, birth weight, and birth type. The results revealed that the ANN model is an appropriate tool for identifying data patterns to predict lamb growth in terms of ADG given specific gene polymorphism, birth weight, and birth type. The PCR-SSCP approach and ANN-based model analyses may be used in molecular marker-assisted breeding programs to improve the efficacy of sheep production.
- Recent studies by agricultural researchers in Pakistan showed that pro-pesticide state policies have contributed to high pesticide use in cotton crops and reported a negative correlation between pesticide use and crop yield. The excessive use of pesticides is causing a financial, environmental, and social impact on farmers. Data mining within the cotton industry, using pest data along with meteorological recordings, shows how pesticide usage can be optimized.
- A platform of artificial neural network (ANN)-based models combined with sensitivity analysis and optimization algorithms was used to integrate published data on the responses of broiler chickens to threonine. Analyses of the ANN models for weight gain and feed efficiency suggested that dietary protein concentration was more important than threonine concentration. The results revealed that a diet containing 18.69% protein and 0.73% threonine may lead to optimal weight gain, while optimal feed efficiency may be achieved with a diet containing 18.71% protein and 0.75% threonine.

== Business ==
In business, data mining is the analysis of historical business activities, stored as static data in data warehouse databases. The goal is to reveal hidden patterns and trends. Data mining software uses advanced pattern recognition algorithms to sift through large amounts of data to assist in discovering previously unknown strategic business information. Examples of what businesses use data mining for include performing market analysis to identify new product bundles, finding the root cause of manufacturing problems, to prevent customer attrition and acquire new customers, cross-selling to existing customers, and profiling customers with more accuracy.

- In today's world raw data is being collected by companies at an exploding rate. For example, Walmart processes over 20 million point-of-sale transactions every day. This information is stored in a centralized database, but would be useless without some type of data mining software to analyze it. If Walmart analyzed their point-of-sale data with data mining techniques they would be able to determine sales trends, develop marketing campaigns, and more accurately predict customer loyalty.
- Categorization of the items available in the e-commerce site is a fundamental problem. A correct item categorization system is essential for user experience as it helps determine the items relevant to him for search and browsing. Item categorization can be formulated as a supervised classification problem in data mining where the categories are the target classes and the features are the words composing some textual description of the items. One of the approaches is to find groups initially which are similar and place them together in a latent group. Now given a new item, first classify into a latent group which is called coarse level classification. Then, do a second round of classification to find the category to which the item belongs to.
- Every time a credit card or a store loyalty card is being used, or a warranty card is being filled, data is being collected about the user's behavior. Many people find the amount of information stored about us from companies, such as Google, Facebook, and Amazon, disturbing and are concerned about privacy. Although there is the potential for our personal data to be used in harmful, or unwanted, ways it is also being used to make our lives better. For example, Ford and Audi hope to one day collect information about customer driving patterns so they can recommend safer routes and warn drivers about dangerous road conditions.
- Data mining in customer relationship management applications can contribute significantly to the bottom line. Rather than randomly contacting a prospect or customer through a call center or sending mail, a company can concentrate its efforts on prospects that are predicted to have a high likelihood of responding to an offer. More sophisticated methods may be used to optimize resources across campaigns so that one may predict to which channel and to which offer an individual is most likely to respond (across all potential offers). Additionally, sophisticated applications could be used to automate mailing. Once the results from data mining (potential prospect/customer and channel/offer) are determined, this "sophisticated application" can either automatically send an e-mail or a regular mail. Finally, in cases where many people will take an action without an offer, "uplift modeling" can be used to determine which people have the greatest increase in response if given an offer. Uplift modeling thereby enables marketers to focus mailings and offers on persuadable people, and not to send offers to people who will buy the product without an offer. Data clustering can also be used to automatically discover the segments or groups within a customer data set.
- Businesses employing data mining may see a return on investment, but also they recognize that the number of predictive models can quickly become very large. For example, rather than using one model to predict how many customers will churn, a business may choose to build a separate model for each region and customer type. In situations where a large number of models need to be maintained, some businesses turn to more automated data mining methodologies.
- Data mining can be helpful to human resources (HR) departments in identifying the characteristics of their most successful employees. Information obtained – such as universities attended by highly successful employees – can help HR focus recruiting efforts accordingly. Additionally, Strategic Enterprise Management applications help a company translate corporate-level goals, such as profit and margin share targets, into operational decisions, such as production plans and workforce levels.
- Data mining can be helpful to organizations. Organizational Data Mining (ODM) is defined as leveraging data mining (DM) tools and technologies to enhance organizational decision-making process by transforming data into valuable and actionable knowledge in order to gain a strategic and business competitive advantage. Data obtained – such as employee turnover rates – can help organizations focus their retention efforts accordingly. Additionally, organizational performance management data-mining and analytics applications help firms translate company-level goals, such as profit and sales targets, into operational decisions, as workers KPI and required measured effort levels.
- Market basket analysis has been used to identify the purchase patterns of the Alpha Consumer. Analyzing the data collected on this type of user has allowed companies to predict future buying trends and forecast supply demands.
- Data mining is a highly effective tool in the catalog marketing industry. Catalogers have a rich database of history of their customer transactions for millions of customers dating back a number of years. Data mining tools can identify patterns among customers and help identify the most likely customers to respond to upcoming mailing campaigns.
- Data mining for business applications can be integrated into a complex modeling and decision-making process. LIONsolver uses Reactive business intelligence (RBI) to advocate a "holistic" approach that integrates data mining, modeling, and interactive visualization into an end-to-end discovery and continuous innovation process powered by human and automated learning.
- In the area of decision making, the RBI approach has been used to mine knowledge that is progressively acquired from the decision maker, and then self-tune the decision method accordingly. The relation between the quality of a data mining system and the amount of investment that the decision maker is willing to make was formalized by providing an economic perspective on the value of "extracted knowledge" in terms of its payoff to the organization This decision-theoretic classification framework was applied to a real-world semiconductor wafer manufacturing line, where decision rules for effectively monitoring and controlling the semiconductor wafer fabrication line were developed.
- An example of data mining related to an integrated-circuit (IC) production line is described in the paper "Mining IC Test Data to Optimize VLSI Testing." In this paper, the application of data mining and decision analysis to the problem of die-level functional testing is described. Experiments mentioned demonstrate the ability to apply a system of mining historical die-test data to create a probabilistic model of patterns of die failure. These patterns are then utilized to decide, in real time, which die to test next and when to stop testing. This system has been shown, based on experiments with historical test data, to have the potential to improve profits on mature IC products. Other examples of the application of data mining methodologies in semiconductor manufacturing environments suggest that data mining methodologies may be particularly useful when data is scarce, and the various physical and chemical parameters that affect the process exhibit highly complex interactions. Another implication is that on-line monitoring of the semiconductor manufacturing process using data mining may be highly effective.

== Science and engineering ==
In recent years, data mining has been used widely in the areas of science and engineering, such as bioinformatics, genetics, medicine, education and electrical power engineering.

- In the study of human genetics, sequence mining helps address the important goal of understanding the mapping relationship between the inter-individual variations in human DNA sequence and the variability in disease susceptibility. In simple terms, it aims to find out how the changes in an individual's DNA sequence affects the risks of developing common diseases such as cancer, which is of great importance to improving methods of diagnosing, preventing, and treating these diseases. One data mining method that is used to perform this task is known as multifactor dimensionality reduction.
- In the area of electrical power engineering, data mining methods have been widely used for condition monitoring of high voltage electrical equipment. The purpose of condition monitoring is to obtain valuable information on, for example, the status of the insulation (or other important safety-related parameters). Data clustering techniques – such as the self-organizing map (SOM), have been applied to vibration monitoring and analysis of transformer on-load tap-changers (OLTCS). Using vibration monitoring, it can be observed that each tap change operation generates a signal that contains information about the condition of the tap changer contacts and the drive mechanisms. Obviously, different tap positions will generate different signals. However, there was considerable variability amongst normal condition signals for exactly the same tap position. SOM has been applied to detect abnormal conditions and to hypothesize about the nature of the abnormalities.
- Data mining methods have been applied to dissolved gas analysis (DGA) in power transformers. DGA, as a diagnostics for power transformers, has been available for many years. Methods such as SOM has been applied to analyze generated data and to determine trends which are not obvious to the standard DGA ratio methods (such as Duval Triangle).
- In educational research, where data mining has been used to study the factors leading students to choose to engage in behaviors which reduce their learning, and to understand factors influencing university student retention. A similar example of social application of data mining is its use in expertise finding systems, whereby descriptors of human expertise are extracted, normalized, and classified so as to facilitate the finding of experts, particularly in scientific and technical fields. In this way, data mining can facilitate institutional memory.
- Data mining methods of biomedical data facilitated by domain ontologies, mining clinical trial data, and traffic analysis using SOM.
- In adverse drug reaction surveillance, the Uppsala Monitoring Centre has, since 1998, used data mining methods to routinely screen for reporting patterns indicative of emerging drug safety issues in the WHO global database of 4.6 million suspected adverse drug reaction incidents. Recently, similar methodology has been developed to mine large collections of electronic health records for temporal patterns associating drug prescriptions to medical diagnoses.
- Data mining has been applied to software artifacts within the realm of software engineering: Mining Software Repositories.
- In the field of microbiology, data mining methods have been used for predicting population behavior of bacteria in food.

== Human rights ==
Data mining of government records – particularly records of the justice system (i.e., courts, prisons) – enables the discovery of systemic human rights violations in connection to generation and publication of invalid or fraudulent legal records by various government agencies.

== Medical data mining ==
Some machine learning algorithms can be applied in medical field as second-opinion diagnostic tools and as tools for the knowledge extraction phase in the process of knowledge discovery in databases. One of these classifiers (called Prototype exemplar learning classifier (PEL-C)) is able to discover syndromes as well as atypical clinical cases.

A current medical field that utilizes the process of data mining is Metabolomics, which is the investigation and study of biological molecules and how their interaction with bodily fluids, cells, tissues, etc. is characterized. Metabolomics is a very data heavy subject, and often involves sifting through massive amounts of irrelevant data before finding any conclusions. Data mining has allowed this relatively new field of medical research to grow considerably within the last decade, and will likely be the method of which new research is found within the subject.

In 2011, the case of Sorrell v. IMS Health, Inc., decided by the Supreme Court of the United States, ruled that pharmacies may share information with outside companies. This practice was authorized under the 1st Amendment of the Constitution, protecting the "freedom of speech." However, the passage of the Health Information Technology for Economic and Clinical Health Act (HITECH Act) helped to initiate the adoption of the electronic health record (EHR) and supporting technology in the United States. The HITECH Act was signed into law on February 17, 2009, as part of the American Recovery and Reinvestment Act (ARRA) and helped to open the door to medical data mining. Prior to the signing of this law, estimates of only 20% of United States-based physicians were utilizing electronic patient records. Søren Brunak notes that "the patient record becomes as information-rich as possible" and thereby "maximizes the data mining opportunities." Hence, electronic patient records further expands the possibilities regarding medical data mining thereby opening the door to a vast source of medical data analysis.

== Spatial data mining ==
Spatial data mining is the application of data mining methods to spatial data. The end objective of spatial data mining is to find patterns in data with respect to geography. So far, data mining and Geographic Information Systems (GIS) have existed as two separate technologies, each with its own methods, traditions, and approaches to visualization and data analysis. Particularly, most contemporary GIS have only very basic spatial analysis functionality. The immense explosion in geographically referenced data occasioned by developments in IT, digital mapping, remote sensing, and the global diffusion of GIS emphasizes the importance of developing data-driven inductive approaches to geographical analysis and modeling.

Data mining offers great potential benefits for GIS-based applied decision-making. Recently, the task of integrating these two technologies has become of critical importance, especially as various public and private sector organizations possessing huge databases with thematic and geographically referenced data begin to realize the huge potential of the information contained therein. Among those organizations are:

- Offices requiring analysis or dissemination of geo-referenced statistical data
- Public health services searching for explanations of disease clustering
- Environmental agencies assessing the impact of changing land-use patterns on climate change
- Geo-marketing companies doing customer segmentation based on spatial location.

Challenges in Spatial mining: Geospatial data repositories tend to be very large. Moreover, existing GIS datasets are often splintered into feature and attribute components that are conventionally archived in hybrid data management systems. Algorithmic requirements differ substantially for relational (attribute) data management and for topological (feature) data management. Related to this is the range and diversity of geographic data formats, which present unique challenges. The digital geographic data revolution is creating new types of data formats beyond the traditional "vector" and "raster" formats. Geographic data repositories increasingly include ill-structured data, such as imagery and geo-referenced multi-media.

There are several critical research challenges in geographic knowledge discovery and data mining. Miller and Han offer the following list of emerging research topics in the field:

- Developing and supporting geographic data warehouses (GDW's): Spatial properties are often reduced to simple aspatial attributes in mainstream data warehouses. Creating an integrated GDW requires solving issues of spatial and temporal data interoperability – including differences in semantics, referencing systems, geometry, accuracy, and position.
- Better spatio-temporal representations in geographic knowledge discovery: Current geographic knowledge discovery (GKD) methods generally use very simple representations of geographic objects and spatial relationships. Geographic data mining methods should recognize more complex geographic objects (i.e., lines and polygons) and relationships (i.e., non-Euclidean distances, direction, connectivity, and interaction through attributed geographic space such as terrain). Furthermore, the time dimension needs to be more fully integrated into these geographic representations and relationships.
- Geographic knowledge discovery using diverse data types: GKD methods should be developed that can handle diverse data types beyond the traditional raster and vector models, including imagery and geo-referenced multimedia, as well as dynamic data types (video streams, animation).

== Temporal data mining ==
Data may contain attributes generated and recorded at different times. In this case finding meaningful relationships in the data may require considering the temporal order of the attributes. A temporal relationship may indicate a causal relationship, or simply an association.

== Sensor data mining ==
Wireless sensor networks can be used for facilitating the collection of data for spatial data mining for a variety of applications such as air pollution monitoring. A characteristic of such networks is that nearby sensor nodes monitoring an environmental feature typically register similar values. This kind of data redundancy due to the spatial correlation between sensor observations inspires the techniques for in-network data aggregation and mining. By measuring the spatial correlation between data sampled by different sensors, a wide class of specialized algorithms can be developed to develop more efficient spatial data mining algorithms.

== Visual data mining ==
In the process of turning from analog into digital, large data sets have been generated, collected, and stored discovering statistical patterns, trends and information which is hidden in data, in order to build predictive patterns. Studies suggest visual data mining is faster and much more intuitive than is traditional data mining. See also Computer vision.

== Music data mining ==
Data mining techniques, and in particular co-occurrence analysis, has been used to discover relevant similarities among music corpora (radio lists, CD databases) for purposes including classifying music into genres in a more objective manner.

== Surveillance ==
Data mining has been used by the U.S. government. Programs include the Total Information Awareness (TIA) program, Secure Flight (formerly known as Computer-Assisted Passenger Prescreening System (CAPPS II)), Analysis, Dissemination, Visualization, Insight, Semantic Enhancement (ADVISE), and the Multi-state Anti-Terrorism Information Exchange (MATRIX). These programs have been discontinued due to controversy over whether they violate the 4th Amendment to the United States Constitution, although many programs that were formed under them continue to be funded by different organizations or under different names.

In the context of combating terrorism, two particularly plausible methods of data mining are "pattern mining" and "subject-based data mining".

== Pattern mining ==
"Pattern mining" is a data mining method that involves finding existing patterns in data. In this context patterns often means association rules. The original motivation for searching association rules came from the desire to analyze supermarket transaction data, that is, to examine customer behavior in terms of the purchased products. For example, an association rule "beer ⇒ potato chips (80%)" states that four out of five customers that bought beer also bought potato chips.

In the context of pattern mining as a tool to identify terrorist activity, the National Research Council provides the following definition: "Pattern-based data mining looks for patterns (including anomalous data patterns) that might be associated with terrorist activity — these patterns might be regarded as small signals in a large ocean of noise." Pattern Mining includes new areas such a Music Information Retrieval (MIR) where patterns seen both in the temporal and non temporal domains are imported to classical knowledge discovery search methods.

== Subject-based data mining ==
"Subject-based data mining" is a data mining method involving the search for associations between individuals in data. In the context of combating terrorism, the National Research Council provides the following definition: "Subject-based data mining uses an initiating individual or other datum that is considered, based on other information, to be of high interest, and the goal is to determine what other persons or financial transactions or movements, etc., are related to that initiating datum."

== Knowledge grid ==
Knowledge discovery "On the Grid" generally refers to conducting knowledge discovery in an open environment using grid computing concepts, allowing users to integrate data from various online data sources, as well make use of remote resources, for executing their data mining tasks. The earliest example was the Discovery Net, developed at Imperial College London, which won the "Most Innovative Data-Intensive Application Award" at the ACM SC02 (Supercomputing 2002) conference and exhibition, based on a demonstration of a fully interactive distributed knowledge discovery application for a bioinformatics application. Other examples include work conducted by researchers at the University of Calabria, who developed a Knowledge Grid architecture for distributed knowledge discovery, based on grid computing.
