= Norman H. Nie =

American social scientist

- Born: April 1, 1943; St. Louis, Missouri, United States
- Died: April 2, 2015 (aged 72); Sun Valley, Idaho, U.S.
- Education: University of the Americas, Washington University in St. Louis, Stanford University
- Scientific career
- Fields: Sociology
- Workplaces: Stanford University, The University of Chicago
- Academic advisors: Sidney Verba

Norman Hugh Nie was an American social scientist, university professor, inventor, and pioneering technology entrepreneur, known for being one of the developers of the Statistical Package for the Social Sciences (SPSS). Born in St. Louis, Missouri in 1943, Nie was educated at the University of the Americas in Mexico City, Washington University in St. Louis and Stanford University, where he received a Ph.D. in political science in 1971. He died on April 2, 2015, of lung cancer.

== Biography ==
=== Early years ===
While a graduate student at Stanford, Nie was faced with the daunting task of analyzing data from thousands of individual responses to a survey questionnaire he collected from seven nations with his advisor and mentor Sidney Verba.

Together with two young computer scientists, C. Hadlai ("Tex") Hull and Dale Bent, Nie invented a computer software package called the Statistical Package for the Social Sciences (SPSS). SPSS automated the process of data analysis, allowing users to manipulate data files, transform data, and generate statistics on a mainframe computer. Nie served as CEO from the company's founding in 1975 until 1992, and continued as Chairman of the Board and software design consultant until 2008. SPSS has been a publicly traded company on the NASDAQ since 1993. Originally invented to solve the problem of analyzing data for Nie's dissertation, SPSS soon became widely used among other social scientists and researchers. Along with SAS, it revolutionized empirical social science. In an essay entitled "Doing It Ourselves: The SPSS Manual as Sociology's Most Influential Recent Book", sociologist Barry Wellman wrote:

I have taken a stand here in favor of empowering tools as the most influential sociological development in recent decades. Which is more important? The findings or the tools that enabled us to make them – and many more? Which should we celebrate more? Copernicus' 16th-century hypothesis of the solar system or Galileo's 17th-century invention of the telescope that enabled scholars to understand it clearly? It is an irresolvable dialectic between knowing what to look for and knowing how to find something. But if pressed, I would vote for the toolmakers because they give us the eyes to see things.

=== Life after SPSS ===
In the early years after SPSS's invention, Nie and his colleagues shipped the software to users at cost. But as demand for the product (and its new features and accompanying documentation) expanded, Nie incorporated SPSS and became its president and CEO. During the same period, Nie became one of the most prominent scholars in the field of U.S. politics, particularly the study of American political behavior and public opinion. His intellectual home for 30 years was the University of Chicago, where he took his first academic appointment in 1968. During his tenure, he was twice chairman of the department. He became emeritus at Chicago in 1998.

In July 2009, IBM announced its agreement to purchase SPSS for $1.2 billion.

=== Years in Chicago ===
Nie's Chicago years saw the publication of four major books in political science, three of which won prizes of national recognition for scholarly excellence. His first book, written with Sidney Verba, was Participation in America (1972), which won the Gladys M. Kammerer Award, from the American Political Science Association (APSA) for the best book in U.S. national politics. Soon after, Nie wrote The Changing American Voter (1976) with Verba and John Petrocik. This major work went on to win the Woodrow Wilson Award from the APSA for the best book published in political science. Two years later, Nie co-authored a work of comparative politics with Verba and Jae-on Kim, Participation and Political Equality (1978). Nie reprised his Woodrow Wilson Award in 1996, winning the prize for Education and Democratic Citizenship in America, written with Jane Junn and Kenneth Stehlik-Barry.

=== Life at Stanford ===
In 1998, Nie moved to Stanford University, where he served as a research professor in social sciences and business. He remained active as an author and social scientist and published a book on the politics of the 2000 U.S. Census enumeration, The Hard Count (2006), with Ken Prewitt, D. Sunshine Hillygus, and Heili Pals. After that, he was working with Yorgos Panzaris on a book on technology and social change. He also wrote research articles for academic journals.

=== Stanford Institute for the Quantitative Study of Society ===
On his arrival at Stanford, Nie started the Stanford Institute for the Quantitative Study of Society (SIQSS), where he served as director. The Institute is devoted to the pursuit and sponsorship of high-quality empirical social science research about the nature of society and social change. Nie led a multidisciplinary team of graduate and undergraduate students that included political scientists, economists, sociologists, and statisticians, among others, in research that included such diverse topics as how time is spent on the Internet, how Internet access affects political polarization, Latino voter mobilization, and how educational attainment affects future life outcomes. Research from the Institute has appeared in The New York Times, the Boston Globe, Newsweek, Miller-McCune, and other mainstream publications, as well as in more academic sources such as Public Perspective, Fortschritte der politischen Kommunikations forschung, and IT & Society.

=== Knowledge Networks, Revolution Analytics, and other business interests ===
Nie continued to innovate in the technology and tools field, co-founding the survey research firm Knowledge Networks (KN) with R. Douglas Rivers in 1997; Nie continues to serve as Chairman of the Board of KN. The company remains the only survey vendor to collect survey data over the Internet using probability samples, placing computers into homes that do not have Internet connectivity.

In October 2009, Revolution Analytics (formerly REvolution Computing) appointed Nie as its new CEO. The company provides commercial software & support for the popular open source R (programming language). In May 2010, Forbes Magazine published an in-depth profile on Nie and Revolution Analytics where he was quoted, "R is an absolutely massive advancement on the kind of analytics I invented. It's an opportunity to change the game in the fastest-growing field in software."

Nie has also served as Chairman or board member for a number of high technology firms, including CustomerSat Inc., Vicinity, Lexiquest, and Captura.

=== Awards ===
Nie was the recipient of awards for research and scholarly achievement as well as professional recognition. In 2006, he was awarded the Lifetime Achievement Award from the American Association for Public Opinion Research (AAPOR) for both his technological innovations in survey research and his substantive contributions to the understanding of social and political behavior. He was honored as the KPMG Technology Entrepreneur of the Year in 1986.

In 2009, Nie was elected a fellow of the American Academy of Arts and Sciences.

=== Personal life ===
Norman Nie and his wife Carol resided in Los Altos, California and Sun Valley, Idaho. They are the parents of two grown daughters and have two grandchildren.
