= SPSS =

Statistical analysis software

- Logo icon, v27
- Developers: Norman H. Nie, Dale H. Bent, C. Hadlai Hull
- Release: 1968; 58 years ago
- Stable release: 31.0.0 / 10 June 2025
- Operating system: Windows (x86-64), macOS (x86-64), Linux (x86-64, ppc64le, IBM Z)
- Platform: Java
- Size: ~1.2 GB
- Type: Statistical analysis Numerical analysis
- License: Subscription or enterprise licensing
- Website: www.ibm.com/spss

SPSS Statistics is a statistical software suite developed by IBM for data management, advanced analytics, multivariate analysis, business intelligence, and criminal investigation. Long produced by SPSS Inc., it was acquired by IBM in 2009. Versions of the software released since 2015 have the brand name IBM SPSS Statistics.

The software name originally stood for Statistical Package for the Social Sciences (SPSS), reflecting the original market, then later changed to Statistical Product and Service Solutions.

== Overview ==
SPSS is a widely used software program for performing statistical analysis, especially within the social sciences, because it provides accessible tools for handling and interpreting data. It is also used by market researchers, health researchers, survey companies, government, education researchers, industries, marketing organizations, data miners, and others. The original SPSS manual (Nie, Bent & Hull, 1970) has been described as one of "sociology's most influential books" for allowing ordinary researchers to do their own statistical analysis. In addition to statistical analysis, data management (case selection, file reshaping and creating derived data) and data documentation (a metadata dictionary is stored in the datafile) are features of the base software.

The many features of SPSS Statistics are accessible via pull-down menus or can be programmed with a proprietary 4GL command syntax language. Command syntax programming has the benefits of reproducible output, simplifying repetitive tasks, and handling complex data manipulations and analyses. Additionally, some complex applications can only be programmed in syntax and are not accessible through the menu structure. The pull-down menu interface also generates command syntax: this can be displayed in the output, although the default settings have to be changed to make the syntax visible to the user. They can also be pasted into a syntax file using the "paste" button present in each menu. Programs can be run interactively or unattended, using the supplied Production Job Facility.

A "macro" language can be used to write command language subroutines. A Python programmability extension can access the information in the data dictionary and data and dynamically build command syntax programs. This extension, introduced in SPSS 14, replaced the less functional SAX Basic "scripts" for most purposes, although SaxBasic remains available. In addition, the Python extension allows SPSS to run any of the statistics in the free software package R. From version 14 onwards, SPSS can be driven externally by a Python or a VB.NET program using supplied "plug-ins". (From version 20 onwards, these two scripting facilities, as well as many scripts, are included on the installation media and are normally installed by default.)

SPSS Statistics places constraints on internal file structure, data types, data processing, and matching files, which together considerably simplify programming. SPSS datasets have a two-dimensional table structure, where the rows typically represent cases (such as individuals or households) and the columns represent measurements (such as age, sex, or household income). Only two data types are defined: numeric and text (or "string"). All data processing occurs sequentially case-by-case through the file (dataset). Files can be matched one-to-one and one-to-many, but not many-to-many. In addition to the cases-by-variables structure and processing, there is a separate Matrix session where one can process data as matrices using matrix and linear algebra operations.

The graphical user interface has two views which can be toggled. The 'Data View' shows a spreadsheet view of the cases (rows) and variables (columns). Unlike spreadsheets, the data cells can only contain numbers or text, and formulas cannot be stored in these cells. The 'Variable View' displays the metadata dictionary, where each row represents a variable and shows the variable properties such as the variable name, format, measurement level, and value labels. Cells in both views can be manually edited, defining the file structure and allowing data entry without using command syntax. This may be sufficient for small datasets. Larger datasets such as statistical surveys are more often created in data entry software, or entered during computer-assisted personal interviewing, by scanning and using optical character recognition and optical mark recognition software, or by direct capture from online questionnaires. These datasets are then read into SPSS.

SPSS Statistics can read and write data from ASCII text files (including hierarchical files), other statistics packages, spreadsheets and databases. It can also read and write to external relational database tables via ODBC and SQL.

Statistical output is to a proprietary file format (*.spv file, supporting pivot tables) for which, in addition to the in-package viewer, a stand-alone reader can be downloaded. The proprietary output can be exported to text or Microsoft Word, PDF, Excel, and other formats. Alternatively, output can be captured as data (using the OMS command), as text, tab-delimited text, PDF, XLS, HTML, XML, SPSS dataset or a variety of graphic image formats (JPEG, PNG, BMP and EMF).

The SPSS logo used prior to the renaming in January 2010

Several variants of SPSS Statistics exist. SPSS Statistics Gradpacks are highly discounted versions sold only to students. SPSS Statistics Server is a version of the software with a client/server architecture. Add-on packages can enhance the base software with additional features (examples include complex samples, which can adjust for clustered and stratified samples, and custom tables, which can create publication-ready tables). SPSS Statistics is available under either an annual or a monthly subscription license.

Version 25 of SPSS Statistics launched on August 8, 2017. This added new and advanced statistics, such as random effects solution results (GENLINMIXED), robust standard errors (GLM/UNIANOVA), and profile plots with error bars within the Advanced Statistics and Custom Tables add-on. V25 also introduced new Bayesian statistics capabilities, a method of statistical inference, and publication ready charts, such as powerful new charting capabilities, including new default templates and the ability to share with Microsoft Office applications.

== Versions and ownership history ==
- SPSS 1 - 1968
- SPSS 2 - 1983
- SPSS 5 - 1993
- SPSS 6.1 - 1995
- SPSS 7.5 - 1997
- SPSS 8 - 1998
- SPSS 9 - 1999
- SPSS 10 - 1999
- SPSS 11 - 2002
- SPSS 12 - 2004
- SPSS 13 - 2005
- SPSS 14 - 2006
- SPSS 15 - 2006
- SPSS 16 - 2007
- SPSS 17 - 2008
- PASW 17 - 2009
- PASW 18 - 2009
- SPSS 19 - 2010
- SPSS 20 - 2011
- SPSS 21 - 2012
- SPSS 22 - 2013
- SPSS 23 - 2015
- SPSS 24 - 2016, March
- SPSS 25 - 2017, July
- SPSS 26 - 2018
- SPSS 27 - 2019, June (and 27.0.1 in November, 2020)
- SPSS 28 - 2021, May
- SPSS 29 - 2022, Sept
- SPSS 30 - 2024, Sept
- SPSS 31 - 2025, June

SPSS was released in its first version in 1968 as the Statistical Package for the Social Sciences (SPSS) after being developed by Norman H. Nie, Dale H. Bent, and C. Hadlai Hull. Those principals incorporated as SPSS Inc. in 1975. Early versions of SPSS Statistics were written in Fortran and designed for batch processing on mainframes, including for example IBM and ICL versions, originally using punched cards for data and program input. A processing run read a command file of SPSS commands and either a raw input file of fixed-format data with a single record type, or a 'getfile' of data saved by a previous run. To save precious computer time an 'edit' run could be done to check command syntax without analysing the data. From version 10 (SPSS-X) in 1983, data files could contain multiple record types.

Prior to SPSS 16.0, different versions of SPSS were available for Windows, Mac OS X and Unix.

SPSS Statistics version 13.0 for Mac OS X was not compatible with Intel-based Macintosh computers, due to the Rosetta emulation software causing errors in calculations. SPSS Statistics 15.0 for Windows needed a downloadable hotfix to be installed in order to be compatible with Windows Vista.

From version 16.0, the same version runs under Windows, Mac, and Linux. The graphical user interface is written in Java. The Mac OS version is provided as a Universal binary, making it fully compatible with both PowerPC and Intel-based Mac hardware.

SPSS Inc announced on July 28, 2009, that it was being acquired by IBM for US$1.2 billion. Because of a dispute about ownership of the name "SPSS", between 2009 and 2010, the product was referred to as PASW (Predictive Analytics SoftWare). As of January 2010, it became "SPSS: An IBM Company". Complete transfer of business to IBM was done by October 1, 2010. By that date, SPSS: An IBM Company ceased to exist. IBM SPSS is now fully integrated into the IBM Corporation, and is one of the brands under IBM Software Group's Business Analytics Portfolio, together with IBM Algorithmics, IBM Cognos and IBM OpenPages.

Companion software in the "IBM SPSS" family are used for data mining and text analytics (IBM SPSS Modeler), realtime credit scoring services (IBM SPSS Collaboration and Deployment Services), and structural equation modeling (IBM SPSS Amos).

SPSS Data Collection and SPSS Dimensions were sold in 2015 to UNICOM Systems, Inc., a division of UNICOM Global, and merged into the integrated software suite UNICOM Intelligence (survey design, survey deployment, data collection, data management and reporting).

=== IDA (Interactive Data Analysis) ===
IDA (Interactive Data Analysis) was a software package that originated at what was formerly the National Opinion Research Center (NORC), at the University of Chicago. Initially offered on the HP-2000, somewhat later, under the ownership of SPSS, it was also available on MUSIC/SP. Regression analysis was one of IDA's strong points.

=== SCSS - Conversational / Columnar SPSS ===
SCSS was a software product intended for online use of IBM mainframes.

Although the "C" was for "conversational", it also represented a distinction regarding how the data was stored: it used a column-oriented rather than a row-oriented (internal) database.

This gave good interactive response time for the SPSS Conversational Statistical System (SCSS), whose strong point, as with SPSS, was Cross-tabulation.

=== Project NX ===
In October 2020, IBM announced the start of an Early Access Program for the "New SPSS Statistics", codenamed Project NX. It contains "many of your favorite SPSS capabilities presented in a new easy to use interface, with integrated guidance, multiple tabs, improved graphs and much more".

In December, 2021, IBM opened up the Early Access Program for the next generation of SPSS Statistics for more users and shared more visuals about it.

== See also ==
- Comparison of statistical packages
- JASP and jamovi, both open-source and free of charge alternatives, offering frequentist and Bayesian models
- PSPP, a free SPSS replacement from the GNU Project
- SPSS Modeler
