= Data mining =

Process of analyzing large data sets

Data mining is the process of extracting and finding patterns in massive data sets involving methods at the intersection of machine learning, statistics, and database systems. Data mining is an interdisciplinary subfield of computer science and statistics with an overall goal of extracting information (with intelligent methods) from a data set and transforming the information into a comprehensible structure for further use. Data mining is the analysis step of the "knowledge discovery in databases" process, or KDD. Aside from the raw analysis step, it also involves database and data management aspects, data pre-processing, model and inference considerations, interestingness metrics, complexity considerations, post-processing of discovered structures, visualization, and online updating.

The term "data mining" is a misnomer because the goal is the extraction of patterns and knowledge from large amounts of data, not the extraction (mining) of data itself. It also is a buzzword and is frequently applied to any form of large-scale data or information processing (collection, extraction, warehousing, analysis, and statistics) as well as any application of computer decision support systems, including artificial intelligence (e.g., machine learning) and business intelligence. Often the more general terms (large scale) data analysis and analytics—or, when referring to actual methods, artificial intelligence and machine learning—are more appropriate.

The actual data mining task is the semi-automatic or automatic analysis of massive quantities of data to extract previously unknown, interesting patterns such as groups of data records (cluster analysis), unusual records (anomaly detection), and dependencies (association rule mining, sequential pattern mining). This usually involves using database techniques such as spatial indices. These patterns can then be seen as a kind of summary of the input data, and may be used in further analysis or, for example, in machine learning and predictive analytics. For example, the data mining step might identify multiple groups in the data, which can then be used to obtain more accurate prediction results by a decision support system. Neither the data collection, data preparation, nor result interpretation and reporting is part of the data mining step, although they do belong to the overall KDD process as additional steps.

The difference between data analysis and data mining is that data analysis is used to test models and hypotheses on the dataset, e.g., analyzing the effectiveness of a marketing campaign, regardless of the amount of data. In contrast, data mining uses machine learning and statistical models to uncover clandestine or hidden patterns in a large volume of data.

The related terms data dredging, data fishing, and data snooping refer to the use of data mining methods to sample parts of a larger population data set that are (or may be) too small for reliable statistical inferences to be made about the validity of any patterns discovered. These methods can, however, be used in creating new hypotheses to test against the larger data populations.

== Etymology ==
In the 1960s, statisticians and economists used terms like data fishing or data dredging to refer to what they considered the bad practice of analyzing data without an a-priori hypothesis. The term "data mining" was used in a similarly critical way by economist Michael Lovell in an article published in the Review of Economic Studies in 1983. Lovell indicates that the practice "masquerades under a variety of aliases, ranging from "experimentation" (positive) to "fishing" or "snooping" (negative).

The term data mining appeared around 1990 in the database community, with generally positive connotations. For a short time in 1980s, the phrase "database mining"™, was used, but since it was trademarked by HNC, a San Diego–based company, to pitch their Database Mining Workstation; researchers consequently turned to data mining. Other terms used include data archaeology, information harvesting, information discovery, knowledge extraction, etc. Gregory Piatetsky-Shapiro coined the term "knowledge discovery in databases" for the first workshop on the same topic (KDD-1989) and this term became more popular in the AI and machine learning communities. However, the term data mining became more popular in the business and press communities. Currently, the terms data mining and knowledge discovery are used interchangeably.

== Background ==
The manual extraction of patterns from data has occurred for centuries. Early methods of identifying patterns in data include Bayes' theorem (1700s) and regression analysis (1800s). The proliferation, ubiquity and increasing power of computer technology have dramatically increased data collection, storage, and manipulation ability. As data sets have grown in size and complexity, direct "hands-on" data analysis has increasingly been augmented with indirect, automated data processing, aided by other discoveries in computer science, specially in the field of machine learning, such as neural networks, cluster analysis, genetic algorithms (1950s), decision trees and decision rules (1960s), and support vector machines (1990s). Data mining is the process of applying these methods with the intention of uncovering hidden patterns. in large data sets. It bridges the gap from applied statistics and artificial intelligence (which usually provide the mathematical background) to database management by exploiting the way data is stored and indexed in databases to execute the actual learning and discovery algorithms more efficiently, allowing such methods to be applied to ever-larger data sets.

== Process ==
The knowledge discovery in databases (KDD) process is commonly defined with the stages:

1. Selection
2. Pre-processing
3. Transformation
4. Data mining
5. Interpretation/evaluation.

It exists, however, in many variations on this theme, such as the Cross-Industry Standard Process for Data Mining (CRISP-DM) which defines six phases:

1. Business understanding
2. Data understanding
3. Data preparation
4. Modeling
5. Evaluation
6. Deployment

or a simplified process such as (1) Pre-processing, (2) Data Mining, and (3) Results Validation.

Polls conducted in 2002, 2004, 2007 and 2014 show that the CRISP-DM methodology is the leading methodology used by data miners.

The only other data mining standard named in these polls was SEMMA. However, 3–4 times as many people reported using CRISP-DM. Several teams of researchers have published reviews of data mining process models, and Azevedo and Santos conducted a comparison of CRISP-DM and SEMMA in 2008.

=== Pre-processing ===
Before data mining algorithms can be used, a target data set must be assembled. As data mining can only uncover patterns actually present in the data, the target data set must be large enough to contain these patterns while remaining concise enough to be mined within an acceptable time limit. A common source for data is a data mart or data warehouse. Pre-processing is essential to analyze the multivariate data sets before data mining. The target set is then cleaned. Data cleaning removes the observations containing noise and those with missing data.

=== Data mining ===
Data mining involves six common classes of tasks:

- Anomaly detection (outlier/change/deviation detection) – The identification of unusual data records, that might be interesting or data errors that require further investigation due to being out of standard range.
- Association rule learning (dependency modeling) – Searches for relationships between variables. For example, a supermarket might gather data on customer purchasing habits. Using association rule learning, the supermarket can determine which products are frequently bought together and use this information for marketing purposes. This is sometimes referred to as market basket analysis.
- Clustering – is the task of discovering groups and structures in the data that are in some way or another "similar", without using known structures in the data.
- Classification – is the task of generalizing known structure to apply to new data. For example, an e-mail program might attempt to classify an e-mail as "legitimate" or as "spam".
- Regression – attempts to find a function that models the data with the least error that is, for estimating the relationships among data or datasets.
- Summarization – providing a more compact representation of the data set, including visualization and report generation.

=== Results validation ===
An example of data produced by data dredging through a bot operated by statistician Tyler Vigen, apparently showing a close link between the best word winning a spelling bee competition and the number of people in the United States killed by venomous spiders

Data mining can unintentionally be misused, producing results that appear to be significant but which do not actually predict future behavior and cannot be reproduced on a new sample of data, therefore bearing little use. This is sometimes caused by investigating too many hypotheses and not performing proper statistical hypothesis testing. A simple version of this problem in machine learning is known as overfitting, but the same problem can arise at different phases of the process and thus a train/test split—when applicable at all—may not be sufficient to prevent this from happening.

The final step of knowledge discovery from data is to verify that the patterns produced by the data mining algorithms occur in the wider data set. Not all patterns found by the algorithms are necessarily valid. It is common for data mining algorithms to find patterns in the training set which are not present in the general data set. This is called overfitting. To overcome this, the evaluation uses a test set of data on which the data mining algorithm was not trained. The learned patterns are applied to this test set, and the resulting output is compared to the desired output. For example, a data mining algorithm trying to distinguish "spam" from "legitimate" e-mails would be trained on a training set of sample e-mails. Once trained, the learned patterns would be applied to the test set of e-mails on which it had not been trained. The accuracy of the patterns can then be measured from how many e-mails they correctly classify. Several statistical methods may be used to evaluate the algorithm, such as ROC curves.

If the learned patterns do not meet the desired standards, it is necessary to re-evaluate and modify the pre-processing and data mining steps. If the learned patterns do meet the desired standards, the final step is to interpret them and transform them into knowledge.

== Research ==
The premier professional body in the field is the Association for Computing Machinery's (ACM) Special Interest Group (SIG) on Knowledge Discovery and Data Mining (SIGKDD). Since 1989, this ACM SIG has hosted an annual international conference and published its proceedings, and since 1999 it has published a biannual academic journal titled "SIGKDD Explorations".

Computer science conferences on data mining include:

- CIKM Conference – ACM Conference on Information and Knowledge Management
- European Conference on Machine Learning and Principles and Practice of Knowledge Discovery in Databases
- KDD Conference – ACM SIGKDD Conference on Knowledge Discovery and Data Mining

Data mining topics are also present in many data management/database conferences such as the ICDE Conference, SIGMOD Conference and International Conference on Very Large Data Bases.

== Standards ==
There have been some efforts to define standards for the data mining process, for example, the 1999 European Cross-Industry Standard Process for Data Mining (CRISP-DM 1.0) and the 2004 Java Data Mining standard (JDM 1.0). Development on successors to these processes (CRISP-DM 2.0 and JDM 2.0) was active in 2006 but has stalled since. JDM 2.0 was withdrawn without reaching a final draft.

For exchanging the extracted models—in particular for use in predictive analytics—the key standard is the Predictive Model Markup Language (PMML), which is an XML-based language developed by the Data Mining Group (DMG) and supported as exchange format by many data mining applications. As the name suggests, it only covers prediction models, a particular data mining task of high importance to business applications. However, extensions to cover (for example) subspace clustering have been proposed independently of the DMG.

== Notable uses ==
Data mining is used wherever there is digital data available. Notable examples of data mining can be found throughout business, medicine, science, finance, construction, and surveillance.

== Privacy concerns and ethics ==
While the term "data mining" itself may have no ethical implications, it is often associated with the mining of information in relation to user behavior (ethical and otherwise).

The ways in which data mining can be used can in some cases and contexts raise questions regarding privacy, legality, and ethics. In particular, data mining government or commercial data sets for national security or law enforcement purposes, such as in the Total Information Awareness Program or in ADVISE, has raised privacy concerns.

Data mining requires data preparation which uncovers information or patterns which compromise confidentiality and privacy obligations. A common way for this to occur is through data aggregation. Data aggregation involves combining data together (possibly from various sources) in a way that facilitates analysis (but that also might make identification of private, individual-level data deducible or otherwise apparent). The threat to an individual's privacy comes into play when the data, once compiled, cause the data miner, or anyone who has access to the newly compiled data set, to be able to identify specific individuals, especially when the data were originally anonymous.

Data may also be modified so as to become anonymous, so that individuals may not readily be identified. However, even "anonymized" data sets can potentially contain enough information to allow identification of individuals, as occurred when journalists were able to find several individuals based on a set of search histories that were inadvertently released by AOL.

The inadvertent revelation of personally identifiable information leading to the provider violates Fair Information Practices. This indiscretion can cause financial, emotional, or bodily harm to the indicated individual. In one instance of privacy violation, the patrons of Walgreens filed a lawsuit against the company in 2011 for selling prescription information to data mining companies who in turn provided the data to pharmaceutical companies.

=== Situation in Europe ===
Europe has rather strong privacy laws, and efforts are underway to further strengthen the rights of the consumers. However, the U.S.–E.U. Safe Harbor Principles, developed between 1998 and 2000, currently effectively expose European users to privacy exploitation by U.S. companies. As a consequence of Edward Snowden's global surveillance disclosure, there has been increased discussion to revoke this agreement, as in particular the data will be fully exposed to the National Security Agency, and attempts to reach an agreement with the United States have failed.

In the United Kingdom in particular there have been cases of corporations using data mining as a way to target certain groups of customers forcing them to pay unfairly high prices. These groups tend to be people of lower socio-economic status who are not savvy to the ways they can be exploited in digital market places.

=== Situation in the United States ===
In the United States, privacy concerns have been addressed by the US Congress via the passage of regulatory controls such as the Health Insurance Portability and Accountability Act (HIPAA). The HIPAA requires individuals to give their "informed consent" regarding information they provide and its intended present and future uses. According to an article in Biotech Business Week, "'[i]n practice, HIPAA may not offer any greater protection than the longstanding regulations in the research arena,' says the AAHC. More importantly, the rule's goal of protection through informed consent is approaching a level of incomprehensibility to average individuals." This underscores the necessity for data anonymity in data aggregation and mining practices.

U.S. information privacy legislation such as HIPAA and the Family Educational Rights and Privacy Act (FERPA) applies only to the specific areas that each such law addresses. The use of data mining by the majority of businesses in the U.S. is not controlled by any legislation.

== Copyright law ==
=== Situation in Europe ===
==== European Union ====
In the EU a database can attract copyright (by reason of the selection or arrangement of their contents, constitute the author's own intellectual creation) and a sui generis Database right, so data mining becomes subject to intellectual property owners' rights that are protected by the Database Directive. Under European copyright database laws, the mining of in-copyright works (such as by web mining) without the permission of the copyright owner is permitted under Articles 3 and 4 of the 2019 Directive on Copyright in the Digital Single Market. A specific TDM exception for scientific research is described in article 3, whereas a more general exception described in article 4 only applies if the copyright holder has not opted out.

The European Commission facilitated stakeholder discussion on text and data mining in 2013, under the title of Licences for Europe. The focus on the solution to this legal issue, such as licensing rather than limitations and exceptions, led to representatives of universities, researchers, libraries, civil society groups and open access publishers to leave the stakeholder dialogue in May 2013.

==== United Kingdom ====
On the recommendation of the Hargreaves review, this led to the UK government to amend its copyright law in 2014 to allow content mining as a limitation and exception. The UK was the second country in the world to do so after Japan, which introduced an exception in 2009 for data mining. However, due to the restriction of the Information Society Directive (2001), the UK exception only allows content mining for non-commercial purposes. UK copyright law also does not allow this provision to be overridden by contractual terms and conditions.

==== Switzerland ====
Since 2020, also Switzerland has been regulating data mining by allowing it in the research field under certain conditions laid down by art. 24d of the Swiss Copyright Act. This new article entered into force on 1 April 2020.

=== Situation in the United States ===
US copyright law, and in particular its provision for fair use, upholds the legality of content mining in America, and other fair use countries such as Israel, Taiwan and South Korea. As content mining is transformative, that is it does not supplant the original work, it is viewed as being lawful under fair use. For example, as part of the Google Book settlement the presiding judge on the case ruled that Google's digitization project of in-copyright books was lawful, in part because of the transformative uses that the digitization project displayed—one being text and data mining.

== Software ==
=== Free open-source data mining software and applications ===
The following applications are available under free/open-source licenses. Public access to application source code is also available.

- Carrot2: Text and search results clustering framework.
- Chemicalize.org: A chemical structure miner and web search engine.
- ELKI: A university research project with advanced cluster analysis and outlier detection methods written in the Java language.
- GATE: a natural language processing and language engineering tool.
- KNIME: The Konstanz Information Miner, a user-friendly and comprehensive data analytics framework.
- Massive Online Analysis (MOA): a real-time big data stream mining with concept drift tool in the Java programming language.
- MEPX: cross-platform tool for regression and classification problems based on a Genetic Programming variant.
- mlpack: a collection of ready-to-use machine learning algorithms written in the C++ language.
- NLTK (Natural Language Toolkit): A suite of libraries and programs for symbolic and statistical natural language processing (NLP) for the Python language.
- OpenNN: Open neural networks library.
- Orange: A component-based data mining and machine learning software suite written in the Python language.
- PSPP: Data mining and statistics software under the GNU Project similar to SPSS
- R: A programming language and software environment for statistical computing, data mining, and graphics. It is part of the GNU Project.
- scikit-learn: An open-source machine learning library for the Python programming language;
- Torch: An open-source deep learning library for the Lua programming language and scientific computing framework with wide support for machine learning algorithms (development of it moved mostly to the much more used Python-based PyTorch)
- UIMA: The UIMA (Unstructured Information Management Architecture) is a component framework for analyzing unstructured content such as text, audio and video – originally developed by IBM.
- Weka: A suite of machine learning software applications written in the Java programming language.

=== Proprietary data-mining software and applications ===
The following applications are available under proprietary licenses.

- Angoss KnowledgeSTUDIO: data mining tool
- LIONsolver: an integrated software application for data mining, business intelligence, and modeling that implements the Learning and Intelligent OptimizatioN (LION) approach.
- PolyAnalyst: data and text mining software by Megaputer Intelligence.
- Microsoft Analysis Services: data mining software provided by Microsoft.
- NetOwl: suite of multilingual text and entity analytics products that enable data mining.
- Oracle Data Mining: data mining software by Oracle Corporation.
- Qlucore Omics Explorer: data mining software.
- RapidMiner: An environment for machine learning and data mining experiments.
- SAS Enterprise Miner: data mining software provided by the SAS Institute.
- SPSS Modeler: data mining software provided by IBM.
- STATISTICA Data Miner: data mining software provided by StatSoft.
- Tanagra: Visualization-oriented data mining software, also for teaching.
- Vertica: data mining software provided by Hewlett-Packard.
- Google Cloud Platform: automated custom ML models managed by Google.
- Amazon SageMaker: managed service provided by Amazon for creating & productionising custom ML models.

== See also ==
Methods

- Agent mining – Computer science research field
- Anomaly/outlier/change detection – Approach in data analysis
- Association rule learning – Method for discovering interesting relations between variables in databases
- Bayesian network – Probabilistic graphical representation of causal relationships
- Classification – Categorization of data using statistics
- Cluster analysis – Grouping a set of objects by similarity
- Decision tree – Decision support tool
- Ensemble learning – Statistics and machine learning technique
- Factor analysis – Statistical method
- Genetic algorithms – Competitive algorithm for searching a problem space
- Intention mining
- Learning classifier system – Paradigm of rule-based machine learning methods
- Multilinear subspace learning – Approach to dimensionality reduction
- Neural network – Computational model used in machine learning
- Regression analysis – Set of statistical processes for estimating the relationships among variables
- Sequence mining – Data mining technique
- Structured data analysis
- Support vector machines – Set of methods for supervised statistical learning
- Text mining – Process of analysing text to extract information from it
- Time series analysis – Sequence of data points over time

Application domains

- Analytics – Discovery, interpretation, and communication of meaningful patterns in data
- Behavior informatics – Research method
- Big data – Extremely large or complex datasets
- Bioinformatics – Computational analysis of large, complex sets of biological data
- Business intelligence – Strategies for analysis and use of data
- Data analysis
- Data warehouse – Centralized storage of knowledge
- Decision support system – Information systems supporting business or organizational decision-making activities
- Domain driven data mining
- Drug discovery – Pharmaceutical discovery procedure
- Exploratory data analysis – Approach of analyzing data sets in statistics
- Predictive analytics – Statistical techniques analyzing facts to make predictions about unknown events
- Real-time data – Information delivered immediately after collection
- Web mining – Process of analyzing large data sets

Application examples

- Automatic number plate recognition in the United Kingdom
- Customer analytics
- Educational data mining – Research field
- National Security Agency – U.S. signals intelligence organization
- Quantitative structure–activity relationship – Predictive chemical model
- Surveillance / Mass surveillance (e.g., Stellar Wind)

Related topics

For more information about extracting information out of data (as opposed to analyzing data), see:

- Data integration – Combining data from multiple sources
- Data transformation – Converting data between different formats
- Electronic discovery – In legal proceedings
- Information extraction – Machine reading of unstructured documents
- Information integration – Cohesive synthesis of information
- Named-entity recognition – Extraction of named entity mentions in unstructured text into pre-defined categories
- Profiling (information science) – Creation and use of user profiles via data analysis
- Psychometrics – Theory and technique of psychological measurement
- Social media mining – Obtaining data from a social media user's content
- Surveillance capitalism – Concept in political economics
- Web scraping – Method of extracting data from websites

Other resources

- International Journal of Data Warehousing and Mining
