= List of University of Münster people =

This list contains some of the most notable alumni, scientists, lecturer and honorary doctors of the University of Münster (Westfälische Wilhelms-Universität Münster).

== Alumni ==
- Johannes Georg Bednorz (born 1950), Nobel Prize winner (1987)
- Kamla Bhasin (1946–2021), Indian developmental feminist activist
- Walter Blume (SS officer) (1906–1974), SS commander and leader of Sonderkommando 7a, part of the extermination commando group Einsatzgruppe B.
- Tobias Böckers (born 1964), medical academic
- Lars Clausen (1935-2010), sociologist
- Wolfgang Clement (1940–2020), politician
- Kai Diekmann (born 1964), Chief Editor of Bild, Europe's largest newspaper (3.5 million copies)
- Andreas Raymond Dombret (born 1960), Münster School of Business Administration and Economics; member of the Executive Board of the Deutsche Bundesbank; former Vice-Chairman Europe Bank of America, Director Germany, Austria, Swiss
- Gerd Faltings (born 1954), mathematician, Fields Medal
- Dieter Fenske (born 1942), chemist
- Birgit Fischer (born 1962), athlete
- Friedhelm Gehrmann (born 1939), economist and social scientist
- Monika Grütters (born 1962), politician
- Klaus Günther (born 1957), chemist and honorary professor
- August Hanning (born 1946), President of the Bundesnachrichtendienst
- Gustav Heinemann (1899–1976), politician, former President of Germany
- Matthias Hentze (born 1960), Associate Director, European Molecular Biology Laboratory
- Friedrich Hirzebruch (1927–2012), mathematician
- Thomas Hoeren (born 1961), intellectual property judge and lawyer
- Erich Kamke (1890–1961), mathematician
- Hans Langmaack (born 1934), computer scientist and mathematician
- Pia Lamberty (born 1984), social psychologist and co-founder of the Center for Monitoring, Analysis and Strategy
- Jens Lehmann (born 1969), footballer (goalkeeper) of the German football team
- Ursula von der Leyen (born 1958), doctor; President of the European Commission
- Wilhelmine Lübke (1885–1981), First Lady
- Niklas Luhmann (1927–1998), sociologist
- Ulrike Marie Meinhof (1934–1976), member of the Red Army Faction
- Gilmar Mendes (born 1955), Minister of Brazilian Supreme Federal Court
- Thomas Middelhoff (born 1953), Board of Directors, Bertelsmann
- Georg Milbradt (born 1945), Minister-President of Saxony
- Walter Momper (born 1945), politician
- Ernst Nolte (1923–2016), historian and philosopher
- René Obermann (born 1963), businessman
- Adalbert Parmet (1830–1898), priest
- Ruprecht Polenz (born 1946), politician
- Kurt Schumacher (1895–1952), politician
- Rudolf Seiters (born 1937), politician
- Hans-Werner Sinn (born 1948), student, President of the leading Institution for Economic Research (Instituts für Wirtschaftsforschung, IFO)
- Karl Stein (1913–2000), mathematician
- Barbara Stühlmeyer (born 1964), musicologist, writer and contributing editor
- Ludger Stühlmeyer (born 1961), Director of Music ACV
- Hans Tietmeyer (1931–2016), economist
- Klaus Töpfer (born 1938), UNO-Commissar
- Ernst Tugendhat (born 1930), philosopher
- Karl Weierstrass (1815–1897), mathematician
- Harald Weinrich (born 1927), classical scholar
- Marina Weisband (born 1987), politician
- Oliver Welke (born 1966), author, comedian, voice actor and presenter
- Arthur Wieferich (1884–1954), mathematician
- Heinrich August Winkler (born 1938), historian
- Boris Zernikow (born 1964), chair for child pain therapy and pediatric palliative medicine at the Witten/Herdecke University
- Angela Zigahl (1885–1955), teacher and politician
- Klaus Zumwinkel (born 1943), former member of the Board of Directors, Deutsche Post World Net
- Jan Kohlhaase (born 1976), mathematician

== Scientists and lecturers ==
- Wilhelm Ackermann (1896–1962), mathematician
- Kurt Aland (1915–1994), theologian
- Karl Barth (1886–1968), theologian
- Ulrich Beck (1944–2015), sociologist
- Pope Benedict XVI: Joseph Kardinal Ratzinger, (1927–2022)
- Hans Blumenberg (1920–1996), philosopher and intellectual historian
- Wolfgang Burandt (born 1957), lawyer, legal academic and professor for commercial law
- Richard Courant (1888–1972), German-American mathematician.
- Joachim Cuntz (born 1948), mathematician, Gottfried Wilhelm Leibniz Prize
- Max Dehn (1878–1952), German-born American mathematician
- Christopher Deninger (born 1958), mathematician, Gottfried Wilhelm Leibniz Prize
- Gerhard Domagk (1895–1964), Nobel Prize in Medicine (1939)
- Wilhelm Ehmann (1904–1989), musicologist
- Christian E. Elger (born 1949), neurologist, researcher, and academic
- Heinz Gollwitzer (1917–1999), historian
- Jürgen Horst, physician and human geneticist
- Klaus Hildebrand (born 1941), historian
- Joseph Höffner (1906–1987), cardinal of the Roman Catholic Church
- Joachim Jose (born 1961), professor of pharmaceutical and medical chemistry
- Paul Kevenhörster (born 1941), Political scientist
- Wilhelm Killing (1847–1923), mathematician
- Paul Kirchhof (born 1943), jurist
- Johann Kremer (1883–1965), professor of anatomy and human genetics, served in the SS in Auschwitz concentration camp, convicted of war crimes
- Leon Lichtenstein (1878–1933), Polish-German mathematician
- Wolfgang Lück (born 1957), mathematician, Gottfried Wilhelm Leibniz Prize
- Friedrich Mauz (1900–1979), psychiatrist involved with the Nazi T-4 Euthanasia Program
- Johann Baptist Metz (1928–2019), theologian
- Wolfgang Metzger (1899–1979), psychologist
- Klaus Mezger (born 1958), geochemistry, Gottfried Wilhelm Leibniz Prize
- Alfred Müller-Armack (1901–1978), economist, inventor of the social market economy and advisor to the Nazi regime
- Friedrich Münzer (1868–1942), classical scholar, died in Theresienstadt concentration camp
- Frank Natterer (born 1941), mathematician
- Josef Pieper (1904–1997), philosopher
- Heinz Pruefer (1896–1934), mathematician
- Karl Rahner (1904–1984), theologian
- Bernhard Rensch (1900–1990), biologist
- Helmut Schelsky (1912–1984), sociologist
- Song Du-yul (born 1944), philosopher, former prisoner under South Korea's National Security Act
- Dieter Stöffler (born 1939), planetology, Gottfried Wilhelm Leibniz Prize
- Barbara Stollberg-Rilinger (born 1955), history of early modern Europe, Gottfried Wilhelm Leibniz Prize
- Nelly Tsouyopoulos (1930–1950), medical historian and academic
- Otmar Freiherr von Verschuer (1896–1969), human biologist and geneticist
- Dietmar Vestweber (born 1956), cellular biology/biochemistry, Gottfried Wilhelm Leibniz Prize
- Hans Wehr (1909–1981), Islamic scientist; author of the Arabian-English dictionary funded by the Nazi Party
- Hubert Wolf (born 1959), history of Christianity/Catholic theology, Gottfried Wilhelm Leibniz Prize
- Peter Voswinckel (born 1951), German physician, medical historian and author

== Honorary doctors ==
- Jan Assmann (born 1938), (D. theol. h.c. Faculty of Protestant Theology (1998))
- Klaus von Bismarck (1912–1997), (D. theol. h.c. Faculty of Protestant Theology)
- Ernst-Wolfgang Böckenförde (1930–2019), Judge, Bundesverfassungsgericht (2001 Faculty of Law)
- Gilberto Freyre (1900–1987), Ph. D.
- Mikhail Gorbachev (1931–2022)
- Tenzin Gyatso (born 1935), 14th Dalai Lama (2007 Faculty of Chemistry and Pharmacy)
- Jean-Claude Juncker (born 1954), Prime Minister (Luxembourg)
- Wim Kok (1938–2018), Prime Minister (Netherlands) (2003 Faculty of Philosophie)
- Hanna-Renate Laurien (1928–2010), theologian (1996 Faculty of Catholic Theology)
- Reinhard Mohn (1921–2009), Director, Bertelsmann (2001 Faculty of Economics (Münster School of Business Administration and Economics))
- Rupert Neudeck (1939–2016)
- Erich Schumann (1898–1985), jurist (2002 Faculty of Law)
- Wolfgang Thierse (born 1943), politician

== See also ==
- Ona Galdikaitė
