= Gehrmann =

Gehrmann or Gehrman is a surname. Notable people with the surname include:

- Agnes Gehrman (1893–1982), American politician
- Bernard E. Gehrmann (1920–2006), former member of the Wisconsin State Assembly
- Bernard J. Gehrmann (1880–1958), U.S. Representative from Wisconsin
- Don Gehrmann (1927–2022), retired American middle-distance runner
- Friedhelm Gehrmann (born 1939), German scientist in the field of economics and social sciences
- Heike Gehrmann (born 1968), German former field hockey player who competed in the 1988 Summer Olympics
- Paul Gehrmann (born 1995), German footballer
- Paul Gehrman (1912–1986), American professional baseball player

== See also ==
- Gehman
- Germann
- Ehrmann
- Fennica Gehrman
