= Burandt =

Burandt may refer to:

- Burandt Lake, a lake in Minnesota

== People with the surname ==
- Corliss Orville Burandt, American engineer
- Wolfgang Burandt, German jurist
