= Ercis =

Ercis may refer to:

- Erciş, a district of Van province in the east of Turkey
- European Research Center for Information Systems (ERCIS)
