= Education in Liechtenstein =

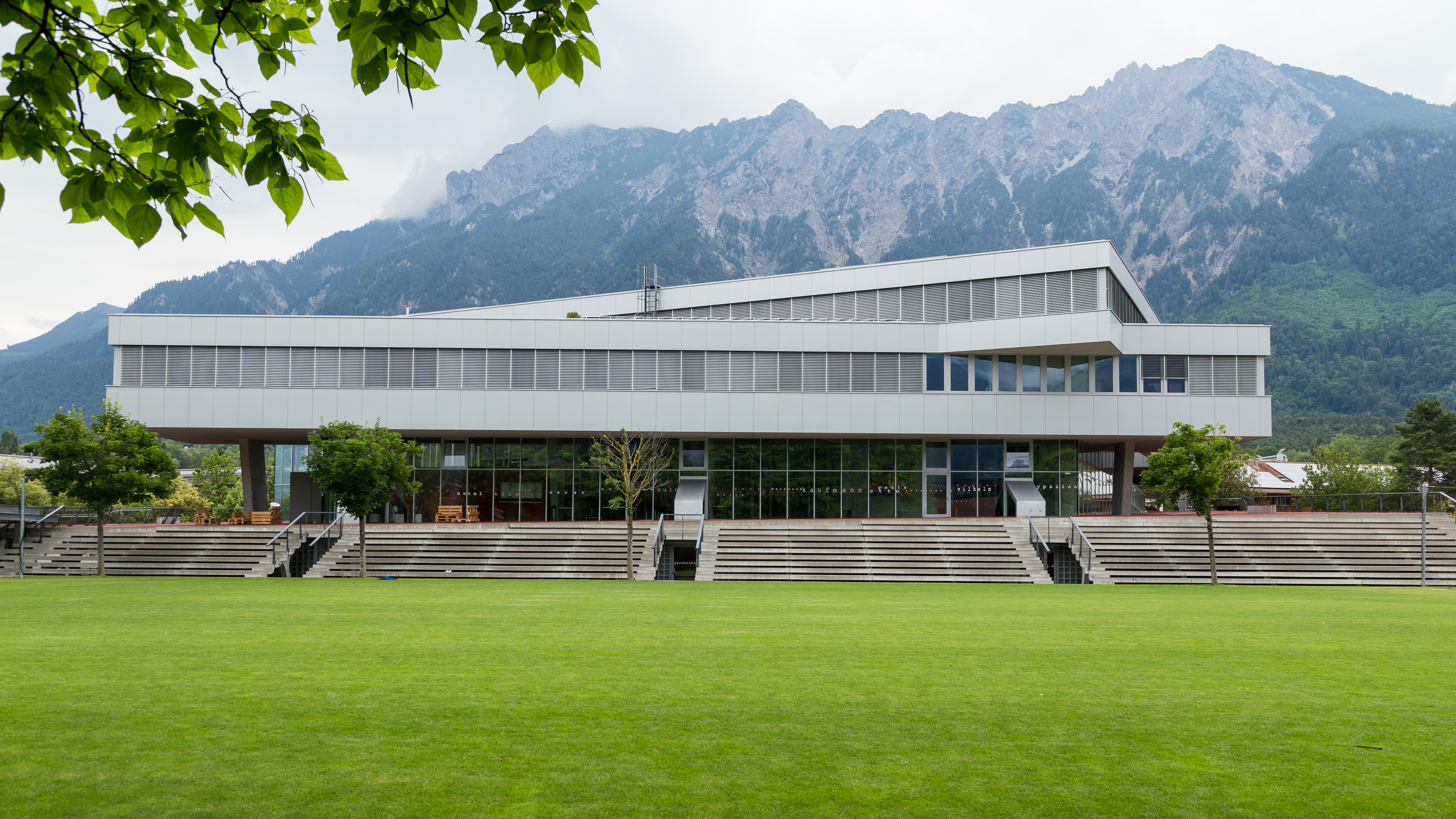
Mühleholz II School Centre

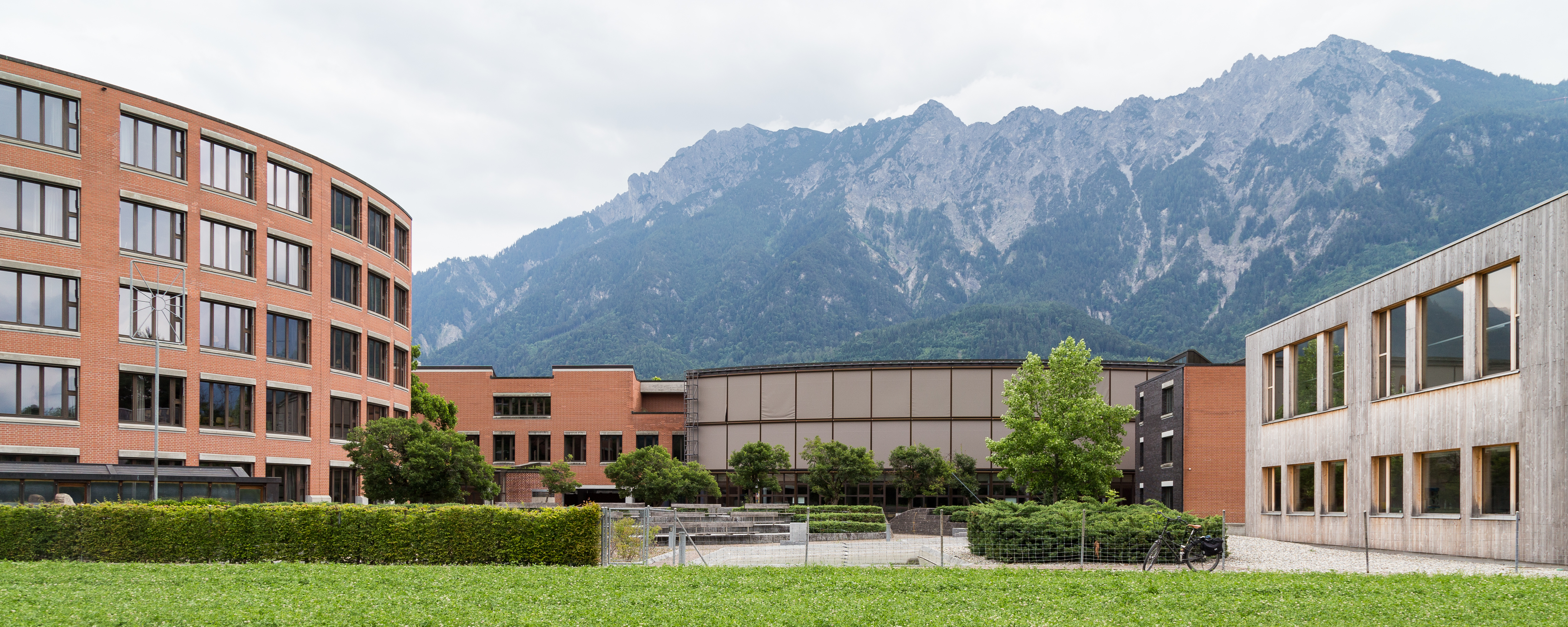
Liechtenstein Gymnasium

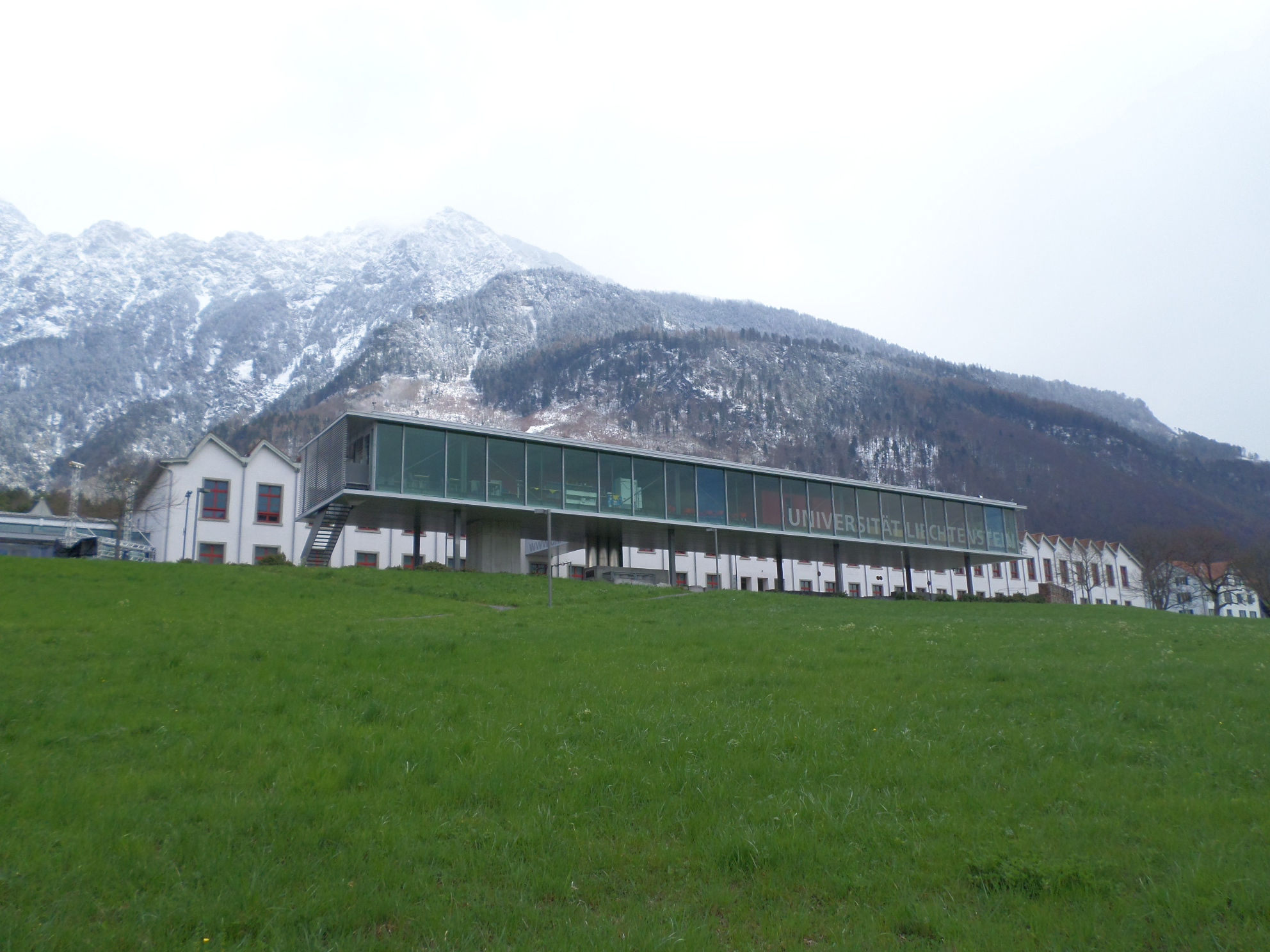
University of Liechtenstein

The education system in Liechtenstein is similar to the Swiss education system.

The literacy rate of Liechtenstein is 100%.

== Elementary and secondary schools ==
There are nine public high schools in the country. These include:

- Liechtensteinisches Gymnasium in Vaduz.
- Realschule Vaduz and Oberschule Vaduz, in the Schulzentrum Mühleholz II in Vaduz
- Realschule Schaan and Sportschule Liechtenstein in Schaan

The first secondary school was opened in 1858, with financial support from physician and politician Ludwig Grass.

Age range	School level	Low academic level	Medium academic level	High academic level
5–6	Preschool	Kindergarten; Duration: 2 years		
7–11	Primary school	Primarschule; Duration: 5 years		
12–15	Middle school	Oberschule; Duration: 4 years	Realschule; Duration: 4 years	Gymnasium lower Duration: 3 years
16–19	High school	Anlehre	Lehre; Duration: 3-4 years	Lehre fsmittelschule Duration: 3-4 years Fachschule; Gymnasium upper Duration: 4 years

== Tertiary education ==
Within Liechtenstein, there are four main centres for higher education:

- University of Liechtenstein
- Private University in the Principality of Liechtenstein
- Liechtenstein Institute
- International Academy of Philosophy

Lehre 3–4 Jahre	Lehre mit BMS 3–4 Jahre	Gymnasium 4 Jahre
Höhere Fachschule (Higher Technical School)	Fachhochschule; Duration: 3-4 years	University; Duration: 4 years

== International comparisons ==
In 2006 Programme for International Student Assessment report, coordinated by the Organisation for Economic Co-operation and Development, ranked Liechtenstein's education as the 10th best in the world. In 2012, Liechtenstein had the highest PISA-scores of any European country.
