= Joachim Jose =

German chemist (born 1961)

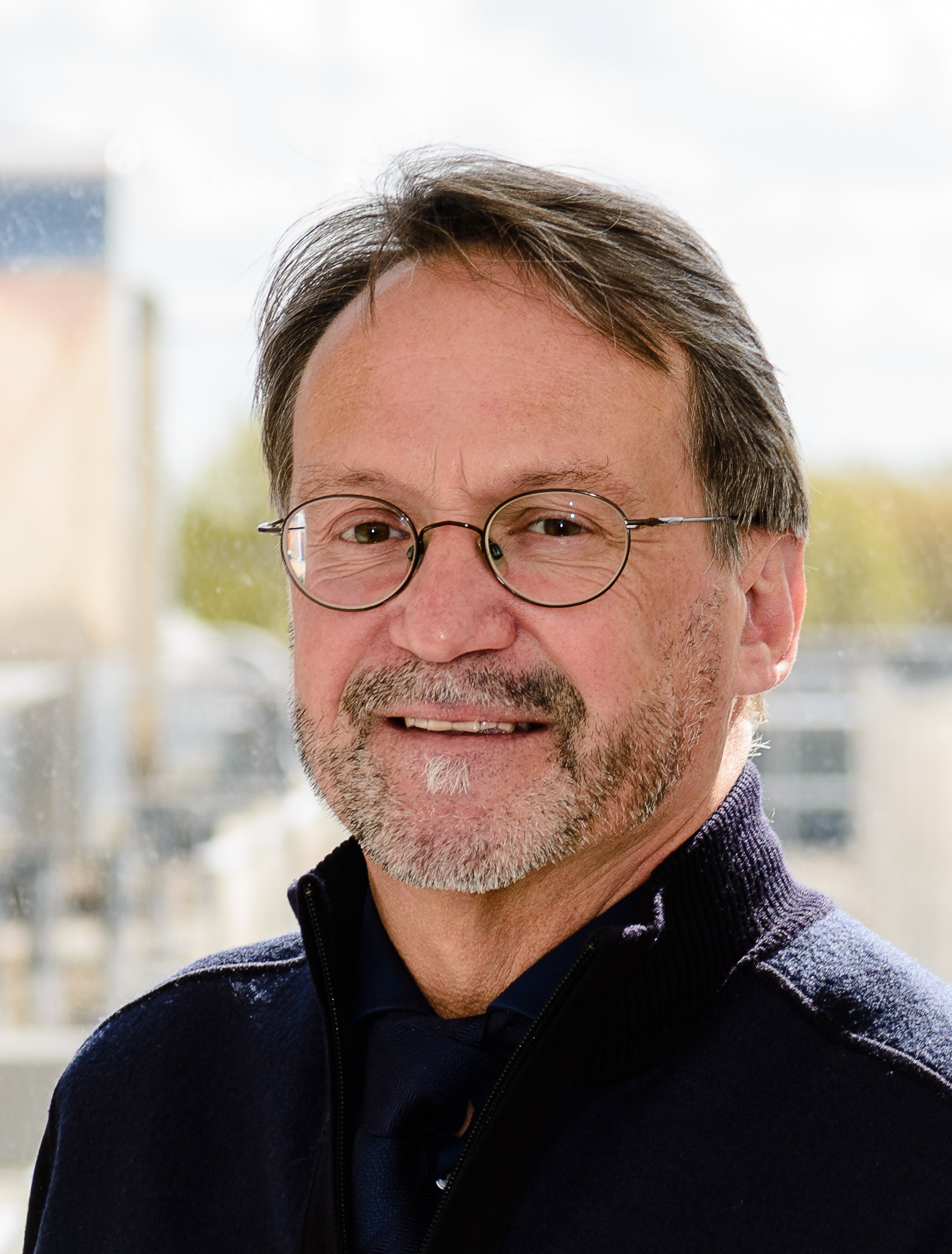
Joachim Jose, a professor for pharmaceutical and medical chemistry at the University of Münster

Joachim Jose (born 12 January 1961 in Quierschied) is professor for pharmaceutical and medical chemistry at the University of Münster, and focuses primarily on the research of bacterial development of drugs and biocatalysts by autodisplay.

== Curriculum Vitae ==
Joachim Jose is a German chemist. He studied biology at Saarland University, Saarbrücken, and obtained his doctoral degree in 1994 with a thesis on the structure and reaction mechanism of bacterial ureases.

During his time as a Post-Doc in the group of Thomas F. Meyer at the Max-Planck-Institute for Biology in Tübingen, he was mainly involved in the discovery and description of a new family of secreted proteins: the autotransporters. The name ‘autotransporters’ was first time mentioned in his publication together with F. Jähnig and T.F. Meyer in Molecular Microbiology (1995, 18: 380-82).

From 1998 until 2003, he was Assistant Professor (C1) in the group of Rolf W. Hartmann, Pharmaceutical and Medicinal Chemistry at Saarland University and obtained his habilitation with a thesis on the evolutive design of drugs and biocatalysts by bacterial surface display.

In 2004, Joachim Jose accepted an offer of the Heinrich-Heine-University Düsseldorf for a Professorship (C3) in Bioanalytics at the Institute for Pharmaceutical and Medicinal Chemistry, where he was appointed Head of the Institute in 2008. Since March 2011, he is a Full professor (W3) and Chair for Pharmaceutical and Medicinal Chemistry at the University of Münster. From 2020 to 2022, he was Dean of FB 12 - Faculty of Chemistry and Pharmacy at the University of Münster. Joachim Jose is co-founder of two start-up companies in the field of 'drug screening and selection' (Pharmacelsus, founded in 2000) and 'biocatalytic synthesis and evolutive drug design' (Autodisplay Biotech, 2008).

His research is mainly focused on the application of "autodisplay", a technology platform that has been developed in his group and which is based on the autotransporter secretion mechanism. Current applications include the expression of human target enzymes for inhibitor testing, evolutive drug design by library expression and HT screening, biocatalytic synthesis of drugs and building blocks, as well as biosensor development by membrane technologies. Joachim Jose is married and has one son.

== Scientific Awards ==
- 1998 Innovation Award in Medicinal Chemistry by GDCh and DPhG
- 2004 Science Award of the SaarLB
- 2009 Corresponding Member of the French National Academy of Pharmacy
- 2013 Medal of the Faculty for Biology and Pharmacy of Claude Bernard University Lyon 1.
- 2023 "Phoenix Pharmazie Wissenschaftspreis" (award for best publication in the field of Pharmaceutical chemistry).
