= Jan vom Brocke =

Liechtenstein information systems researcher

- Born: 1971 (age 54–55)

Academic background
- Education: University of Münster

Academic work
- Discipline: Information Systems
- Website: janvombrocke.com

Jan vom Brocke (born 1971) is an information systems researcher, who is the Chair of Information Systems & Business Process Management at the University of Münster in Germany, and since 2023 Director of ERCIS – The European Research Center for Information Systems. He is regularly ranked among the top researchers globally across all academic disciplines.

== Education ==
Jan vom Brocke graduated with a diploma in information systems from the University of Münster, where he completed his doctorate in business research in 2002 and habilitation in 2007.

== Professional career ==
In 2007 Jan vom Brocke joined the University of Liechtenstein as full professor and inaugural Hilti Endowed Chair of Business Process Management. In 2008 he became head of Department of Information Systems, and from 2012 to 2018 he served as Vice Present Research of the University of Liechtenstein.

Since 2023, Jan vom Brocke is the Chair of Information Systems & Business Process Management at the University of Münster and a Director of ERCIS – The European Research Center for Information Systems. He is a Visiting Professor at the University of Liechtenstein and Visiting Lecturer at the University of St. Gallen and the University of Lucerne in Switzerland, and has been named a member of the Liechtenstein Academy of Science.

In 2025 he has been elected for a three-year term as the President of the Association for Information Systems (AIS).

== Honors and awards ==
Jan vom Brocke has received a number of international research awards, such as the Association for Information Systems (AIS) Senior Scholar Best Publication Award and the AIS Award for Outstanding Contribution to Information Systems Education. He has been named a Fellow of the AIS, an Academic Research Fellow at MIT Center for Information Systems Research, a Fellow of the ESCP Business School Center for Design Science in Entrepreneurship, a Schöller Senior Fellow at the University of Erlangen–Nuremberg, and a Distinguished Professor at the National University of Ireland, Maynooth.

== Research and scholarly work contributions ==
Jan vom Brocke is recognized for information systems research and education of value to economy and society. He has been among the first to establish green information systems and green business process management to investigate in the use and design of information systems to contribute to grand societal and environmental challenges. He served as a Liechtenstein delegate to the European Commission on Information Technology Research and Education, and advised governments across Europe on digital transformation and artificial intelligence. According to Sage Policy Profiles his work has influenced policy documents in Australia, Belgium, Brazil, Brunei, Canada, Denmark, Estonia, Finland, Germany, Indonesia, Kenya, Spain, Sweden, United Kingdom, United States, and Venezuela, among others.

== Bibliography ==
Jan vom Brocke has published in leading academic journals such as listed in the Financial Times top 50 Journals, including Management Information Systems Quarterly (MISQ), Information Systems Research (ISR), Journal of Management Information Systems (JMIS), Management Science, and MIT Sloan Management Review (MIT SMR). He is the author and editor of seminal books, including the International Handbook on Business Process Management 1 and 2, BPM – Driving Innovation in a Digital World, Green Business Process Management, and the Business Process Management Cases volume one, two, and three, among others.

Notable peer-reviewed articles authored/co-authored by Jan vom Brocke include:

- Seidel, S., Frick, C. J., & vom Brocke, J. (2025). Regulating Emerging Technologies: Prospective Sensemaking through Abstraction and Elaboration. MIS Quarterly, 49(1),179–204. doi: 10.25300/MISQ/2024/18039
- Tuunanen, T., Winter, R., & vom Brocke, J. (2024). Dealing with Complexity in Design Science Research: Using Design Echelons to Support Planning, Conducting, and Communicating Design Knowledge Contributions. MIS Quarterly, 48(2), 427–458. doi: 10.25300/MISQ/2023/16700
- Schneider, C., Weinmann, M., Mohr, P., & vom Brocke, J. (2021). When the Stars Shine Too Bright: The Influence of Multidimensional Ratings on Online Consumer Ratings. Management Science, 67(6), 3871–3898. doi: 10.1287/mnsc.2020.3654
- vom Brocke, J., Winter, R., Hevner, A., & Maedche, A. (2020). Accumulation and Evolution of Design Knowledge in Design Science Research: A Journey Through Time and Space. Journal of the Association for Information Systems, 21(3), 520–544. doi: 0.17705/1jais.00611
- Rosemann, M., & vom Brocke, J. (2015). The Six Core Elements of Business Process Management. In vom Brocke, J., & Rosemann, M. (Eds.), Handbook on Business Process Management 1 (pp. 105–122). International Handbooks on Information Systems. Berlin, Heidelberg: Springer. doi: 10.1007/978-3-642-45100-3 5
- Seidel, S., Recker, J., & vom Brocke, J. (2013). Sensemaking and Sustainable Practicing: Functional Affordances of Information Systems in Green Transformations. MIS Quarterly, 37(4), 1275–1299. doi: 10.25300/MISQ/2013/37.4.13
- vom Brocke, J., Simons, A., Niehaves, B., Riemer, K., Plattfaut, R., & Cleven, A. (2009). Reconstructing the Giant: On the Importance of Rigour in Documenting the Literature Search Process. In Newell, S., Whitley, E. A., Pouloudi, N., Wareham, J., & Mathiassen, L. (Eds.), Proceedings of the 17th European Conference on Information Systems (pp. 2206–2217). United States: AIS eLibrary.
