= IgA protease =

IgA protease may refer to:

- IgA specific serine endopeptidase, an enzyme
- IgA-specific metalloendopeptidase, an enzyme
