= Autodisplay =

Autodisplay is a genetic engineering technique which is used to insert a protein of interest on the outer surface of gram-negative bacteria. This is accomplished by attaching the protein of interest to a protein which is known to localize to the surface of the bacterial outer membrane. First introduced in the 1990s, the technique is now widely used in research science and in biotechnology to manipulate bacteria for protein studies, drug discovery, and vaccine development.

== Mechanism ==
Autodisplay is based on the mechanism of bacterial autotransporter proteins. These proteins have a signal peptide at the N-terminus which allow them to be translocated across the bacterial inner membrane and into the periplasm. In the periplasm a β-barrel domain at the protein's C-terminus inserts into the bacterial outer membrane, forming a channel through which the rest of the protein can pass. The rest of the protein threads through this channel across the outer membrane and to the surface of the bacteria. Once it reaches the surface, the protein may stay connected to the membrane-bound β-barrel or it may be cleaved from the membrane and secreted into the extracellular environment. There are several known Autotransporter pathways.

Autodisplay uses this autotransporter system by inserting a protein of interest between the N-terminal signal peptide and the C-terminal β-barrel of an autotransporter. This allow the protein of interest to be carried to the bacterial surface by the regular autotransporter mechanism.

== History ==
Autodisplay is based on the autotransporter proteins of gram-negative bacteria, which were first discovered in the late 1980s, when the IgA1 protease of Neisseria gonorrhoeae was described. By the early 1990s, several groups had attempted to attach heterologous proteins to IgA1 protease and express the product in Escherichia coli, however the N. gonorrhoeae IgA1 protease was not expressed well in E. coli, limiting the usefulness of this system. Subsequently, the IgA1 protease was replaced by an autotransporter native to E. coli, namely the AIDA-1 protein from Enteropathogenic E. coli. This was expressed to much higher levels in E. coli than the previously used N. gonorrhoeae protein had been, allowing this system to be used for larger-scale biotechnological applications.

Autodisplay was invented with goals such as whole cell catalyses, especially with substrates which cannot cross the membranes of bacteria, the expression of peptides/proteins without an attached purification and the expression of immobilized peptides/proteins.

== See also ==
- Arming yeast
