= European Research Center for Information Systems =

German-based research organization

- Abbreviation: ERCIS
- Established: 12 October 2004
- Founder: Jörg Becker
- Founded at: Münster, Germany
- Legal status: Academic institution of the School of Business and Economics at the University of Münster according to §29 Higher Education Act
- Headquarters: Münster, Germany
- Coordinates: 51°58′33.486″N 7°36′6.716″E
- Leader: Jan vom Brocke, Jörg Becker
- Website: ercis.org

The ERCIS – European Research Center for Information Systems is an international research network of universities and research institutions that deals with issues related to digital transformation, information systems, and organizational design. It promotes interdisciplinary research with high societal and economic relevance in collaboration with partners from academia, industry, and the public sector.

== History and Structure ==
ERCIS was founded in 2004 at the University of Münster and is regarded as a pioneer in European information systems research. Today, it is a globally active network focused on the challenges of digital transformation.

The central governance of the network is handled by the Steering Board, which defines the strategic orientation and promotes international collaboration.

The Steering Board is composed of representative members from selected partner institutions of the network.

== Research Focus ==
Researchers at ERCIS study the interaction between people, organizations, and technology in the context of socio-technical information systems. The research is interdisciplinary and application-oriented, covering, among others, the following topics:

- Process science
- Data science
- Business process management (see e.g., the involvement of ERCIS partners in the International Conference on Business Process Management)
- Social media analytics and misinformation
- Digital transformation in small and medium enterprises
- Crisis management
- Artificial intelligence in managerial finance
- e-government & public sector innovation

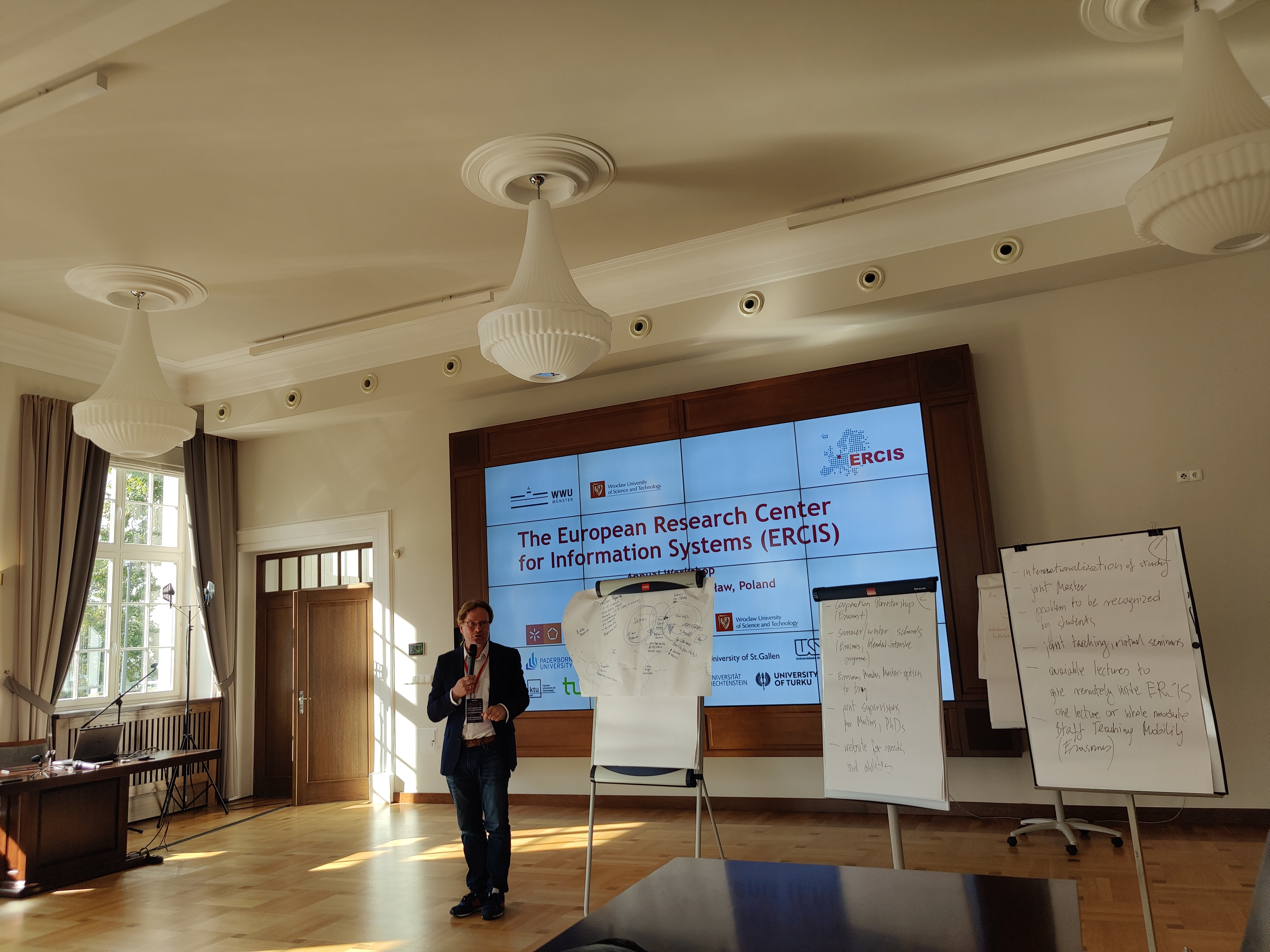
Jan vom Brocke, Academic Director of ERCIS, presenting at the ERCIS Annual Workshop 2023 in Wrocław.

The research combines perspectives from business administration, computer science, law, and sociology. ERCIS’s broad scope ranges from conceptual design through technical implementation to the evaluation of IT systems at individual, organizational, and societal levels.

ERCIS researchers regularly publish academic position papers (similar to op-eds) to actively shape ongoing debates on IT-related topics, particularly at the European level. The goal is to contribute well-founded scientific perspectives to political, societal, and economic discourses and to provide concrete impulses for shaping Digital Transformation.

== Network ==
ERCIS consists of more than 30 partner institutions worldwide, collaborating closely in research and teaching. The network supports regular member exchange through annual workshops and participation in major conferences of the Association for Information Systems, especially ECIS European Conference on Information Systems and ICIS International Conference on Information Systems.

=== International Research Partners ===
ERCIS maintains close relations with the following associated research partners:

Partner Institutions
University	City	Country
Queensland University of Technology	Brisbane	Australia
KU Leuven	Leuven	Belgium
University of Namur	Namur	Belgium
Universidade de São Paulo	São Paulo	Brazil
Copenhagen Business School	Copenhagen	Denmark
Fachhochschule Aachen	Aachen	Germany
Fachhochschule Südwestfalen	Soest	Germany
Humboldt University of Berlin	Berlin	Germany
Ruhr University Bochum	Bochum	Germany
Technical University of Dortmund	Dortmund	Germany
Technical University of Dresden	Dresden	Germany
University of Hamburg	Hamburg	Germany
University of Koblenz	Koblenz	Germany
University of Münster	Münster	Germany
University of Paderborn	Paderborn	Germany
University of Potsdam	Potsdam	Germany
Heidelberg University Hospital	Heidelberg	Germany
Loughborough University	Loughborough	England
Tallinn University of Technology	Tallinn	Estonia
Turku School of Economics	Turku	Finland
University of Jyväskylä	Jyväskylä	Finland
Grenoble École de Management	Grenoble	France
KEDGE Business School	Bordeaux	France
KEDGE Business School	Paris	France
Athens University of Economics and Business	Athens	Greece
University of Galway	Galway	Ireland
Luiss University	Rome	Italy
University of Chieti-Pescara	Chieti	Italy
Catholic University of the Sacred Heart	Milan	Italy
University of Liechtenstein	Vaduz	Liechtenstein
University of Tuscia	Viterbo	Italy
Kaunas University of Technology	Kaunas	Lithuania
Eindhoven University of Technology	Eindhoven	Netherlands
University of Twente	Enschede	Netherlands
Leiden University	Leiden	Netherlands
Utrecht University	Utrecht	Netherlands
University of Agder	Kristiansand	Norway
Vienna University of Economics and Business	Vienna	Austria
University of Gdańsk	Gdańsk	Poland
Wrocław University of Science and Technology	Wrocław	Poland
University of Minho	Guimarães	Portugal
Luleå University of Technology	Luleå	Sweden
University of St. Gallen	St. Gallen	Switzerland
University of Maribor	Maribor	Slovenia
Pohang University of Science and Technology	Pohang	South Korea
University of Seville	Seville	Spain
IE Business School	Madrid	Spain
Charles University in Prague	Prague	Czech Republic
Kharkiv National University of Economics	Kharkiv	Ukraine
Corvinus University of Budapest	Budapest	Hungary
Stevens Institute of Technology	Hoboken	USA
University of Arkansas	Fayetteville	USA

=== Advisory Board ===
An advisory board, consisting of companies from various industries, supports the work of ERCIS and ensures the connection between academia and practice. It promotes applied research, teaching formats, and the development of young talent.
