= Pia Lamberty =

German social psychologist (born 1984)

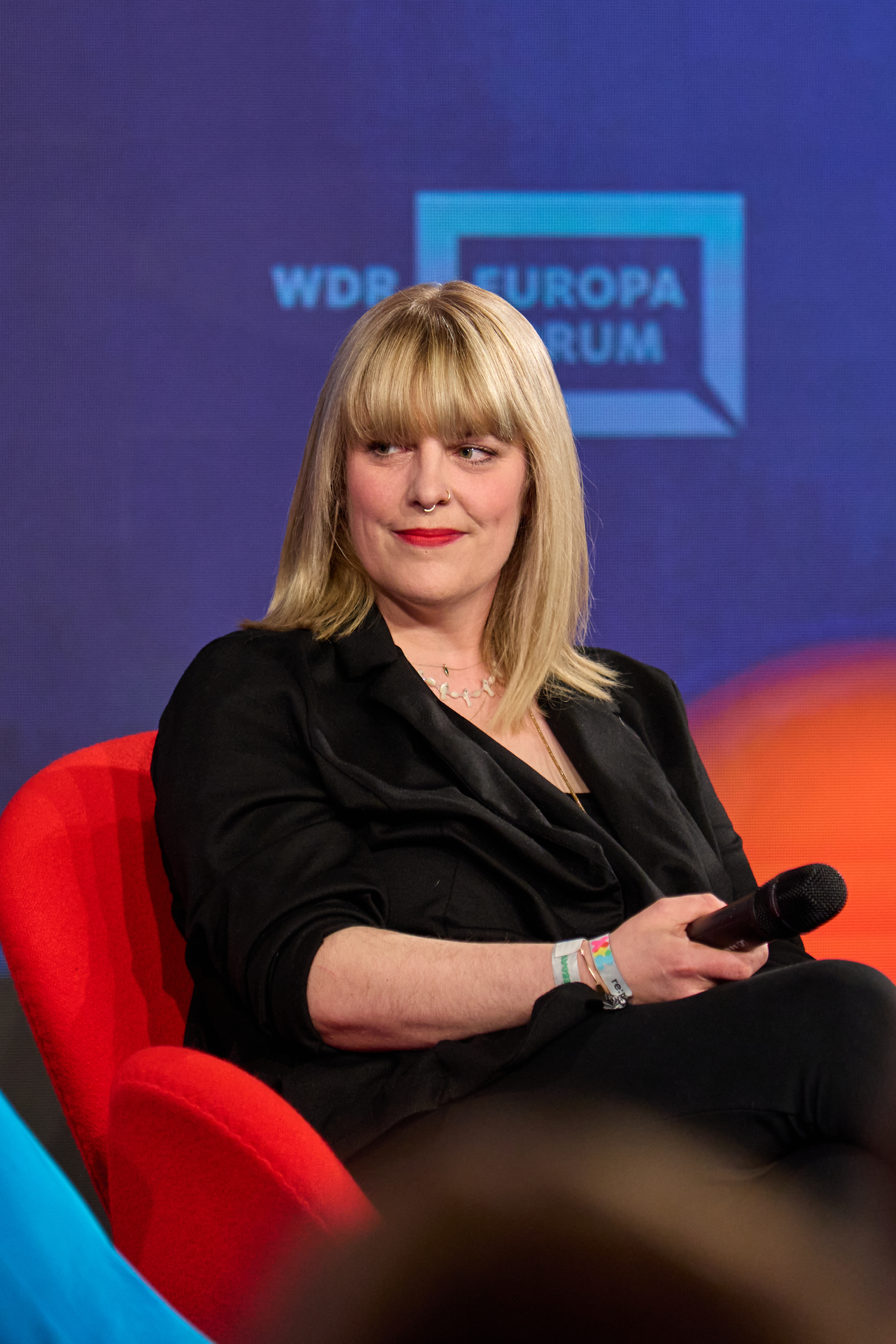
- Pia Lamberty, 2025
- Born: February 11, 1984 (age 42); Groß-Gerau, Germany
- Occupation: Social psychologist

Pia Lamberty (born 11 February 1984) is a German social psychologist who researches conspiracy ideologies. She is a co-founder and co-CEO of the Center for Monitoring, Analysis and Strategy (CeMAS).

== Early life and career ==
Lamberty was born in Groß-Gerau on 11 February 1984. She completed a bachelor's degree in literature and philosophy at RWTH Aachen University. During this time, Lamberty worked as a student assistant at the Centre for Learning and Knowledge Management and at the Chair of Information Management in Mechanical Engineering while pursuing her studies. Subsequently, she completed a master's degree in comparative literature and cultural poetics at the University of Münster.

She also completed a bachelor's degree in psychology at the University of Hagen from 2011 to 2014, graduating with a Bachelor of Science. She then went on to complete a master's degree in psychology with a focus on social cognition and media psychology at the University of Cologne in 2016, graduating with a Master of Science. Her master's thesis dealt with the topic Uncovering hidden agencies: The Role of Trust and Control in the development of conspirational thinking. From June 2015 to January 2016, Lamberty worked as a research assistant for the University of Cologne's Social Cognition Center. She worked on the project "Seventy Years Later: Historical Representations of the Holocaust and their effects on German-Israeli Relations". Since November 2016, she has been working as a PhD student at the University of Mainz. From 2018 to 2019, she completed a research stay with David Leiser at Ben-Gurion University of the Negev in Beersheba, Israel. Lamberty is a member of Comparative Analysis of Conspiracy Theories in Europe, an international specialist network.

In May 2020, Lamberty co-authored the book Fake Facts - Wie Verschwörungstheorien unser Denken bestimmen (Fake Facts - How Conspiracy Theories Influence Our Thinking) with civil rights activist Katharina Nocun. The book explores the reasons why people may be drawn to conspiracy theories. She co-authored two more books with Nocun, which were published in 2021 and 2022.

In March 2021, Lamberty co-founded the Center for Monitoring, Analysis and Strategy (CeMAS), an extremism monitoring agency and think tank, which brings together interdisciplinary expertise on the topics of conspiracy ideologies, disinformation, anti-Semitism and right-wing extremism. She is also its co-CEO.

== Research ==
Lamberty's research examines how people from the 'middle of society' are radicalised by conspiracy theories and reject democracy as a whole. She found that men with a relatively low level of formal education are particularly susceptible to believing in conspiracy myths. However, the reason for this is not a lack of intelligence, but rather a feeling of having been left behind by society. In addition, it can be observed worldwide that people who tend to be politically right-wing are more likely to believe in conspiracy narratives, although conspiracy myths can also be found in left-wing circles. For example, the issue of vaccination brings together vaccine-critical, left-wing alternative parents, esotericists and people from the extreme right. Belief in conspiracy is very widespread. Almost one in five Germans believes in conspiracy narratives on the subject of vaccination. A third believe that politicians are merely puppets of the powers behind them. Lamberty states that "we know from research that in situations that cause a loss of control and feelings of powerlessness, people believe more strongly in conspiracies […] They try to connect loose ends to patterns in order to compensate for this loss of control".

In their book, Lamberty and Nocun reject the term 'conspiracy theory' because it suggests scientific validity where there is none. They propose using the terms 'conspiracy myths' and 'conspiracy narratives' instead.

According to Lamberty, anti-Semitic narratives, which are constantly being updated by conspiracy believers, play a special role. "While for a long time the focus was mainly on the Illuminati or the Bilderbergers, in recent years the philanthropist George Soros has become the subject of many anti-Semitic myths. The danger posed by such conspiracy myths was evident not only in the right-wing extremist terrorist attack in Halle last year [2019]. When we talk about conspiracy mentality, we are referring to a generalised mistrust, a structure of prejudice against all persons and groups who are perceived as powerful. This applies to science and the media, but also to social groups. Jews have often been and continue to be associated with power and are therefore often the subject of conspiracy narratives. This overlap between conspiracy thinking and anti-Semitism is also evident in empirical studies".

Lamberty warned of the dangerous consequences that a conspiracy mentality can have. In the worst case, belief in conspiracies can legitimise terrorist attacks which, Lamberty stated, could be seen in the incidents in Halle and Hanau.

== Reception ==
Alexander Kluy from Der Standard wrote that the "well-written, easy-to-read, scientifically sound book" Fake Facts came at just the right time. "Nocun and Lamberty tackle apocalyptics, financial myths, cancer myths, left-wing and esoteric mythologems. Only the final chapter, with practical advice on dealing with conspiracy theorists, falls short, as is so often the case with analytically strong treatises".

Julia Bähr of the Frankfurter Allgemeine Zeitung wrote in her review of the book: "Where it gets so specific, Fake Facts is particularly instructive. Because thinking about conspiracy narratives involves taking into account their degree of absurdity. Whether you feel comfortable with the idea or not, the fact that a significant portion of society is disconnecting from all rationality is a phenomenon that should be kept in mind, not only academically but also personally. The authors offer recommendations on how to respond to those affected in your circle of acquaintances – and none of them involve ignoring them".

Matthias Meisner from Der Tagesspiegel described the work as a fact-filled and well-researched book: "In view of the rapid succession of events since the beginning of the year, the authors deserve the highest praise for their precise examination of the myths surrounding Covid-19. And thus to the crudeness of 'hygiene demonstrations' and gatherings of 'corona rebels'".

In August 2020, Pia Lamberty shared in an interview with Tagesschau that she was regularly attacked on social media, threatened with death and sexual abuse because of her research.

In May 2021, the Süddeutsche Zeitung newspaper profiled Lamberty and discussed in detail the hate messages she received from conspiracy theorists, particularly as a result of the protests against protective measures against the COVID-19 pandemic in Germany.

== Awards and scholarships ==
2016

- 1st place in the Master's Thesis Award, Department of Psychology, University of Cologne, 2016
- Funding for a research stay at the Centre for Social and Cultural Psychology at the Université libre de Bruxelles, with Olivier Klein

2017

- Doctoral scholarship, Friedrich Ebert Foundation
- 10-month Minerva Fellowship (with David Leiser, Ben-Gurion University of the Negev, Israel)
- Minerva Short-Term Research Grant (with David Leiser, Ben-Gurion University of the Negev, Israel)

2020

- Bad Herrenalber Academy Prize

2023

- Madsack Prize (together with Katharina Nocun)

== Personal life ==
Lamberty has described receiving threats from conspiracy theorists as a result of her work in researching conspiracy ideologies, particularly due to the COVID-19 protests in Germany.
