= Process science =

Interdisciplinary study of processes

Process science is the method of describing change from an inquiry-oriented process perspective. Process science includes algorithms, heuristics, and sequences found in psychology, linguistics, anthropology, politics, and economics. In sociology, processes are temporal. In computer science, a process is the collective input/output.

== Overview ==
=== Principles and phases ===
Vom Brocke et al. state that process science has four central tenets:

1. "Processes are in the focus"
2. A science of discovery (observation), explanation, and investigation
3. Interdisciplinarity
4. A science of social impact

Vom Brocke et al. subdivide process science into three phases:

1. Discovery (emergence)
2. Explanation (dynamics)
3. Intervention (change)

== History ==
The term "process science" has been used in different disciplines, including computer science, business process management, and engineering.

In a paper published in 2021, a group of scholars from diverse scientific backgrounds used the term to introduce an "interdisciplinary study of continuous change". They envisioned a scientific field that gives primacy to processes at various scales. Implicitly drawing on the tenets of process philosophy, process science works on the premise that the world is in a constant state of change and becoming, and scientific work should target at understanding these processes in the study of phenomena of all kinds.

The founding group of the interdisciplinary field of process science includes researchers from social science, management science, and computer science. One of the founding members is the computer scientist Wil van der Aalst.

== Other ==
Process science is an emerging scientific field concerned with studying the nature of change. It provides terminology and develops sets of methods and tools for studying change. Since it is characterized by a highly interdisciplinary approach and a focus on real-world problems, process science can be considered a form of post-disciplinary research. Process science is influenced by numerous fields, including computer science, social science, psychology, natural science, urban science, economics, and engineering.

Process science applies the concept of process to recognize sequences of actions (activities taken by specific actors) and events (dynamics that occur in the environment) that unfold over time. Both are abstract categories formed from instantaneous observations or occurrences. Process science aims to identify and optimize opportunities related to digital trace data. It also focuses on collecting and developing various algorithmic techniques to analyze these data.

The study of processes has been applied to a diverse range of areas, including technological, economic, political, environmental, social, and human aspects of change.

Researchers and practitioners who work on process science-related topics are referred to as process scientists.

== See also ==
- Différance – Concept in literary theory
- Emergence – Unpredictable phenomenon in complex systems
- Granularity – Condition of granules or grains
- Praxis (process) – Process by which a theory, lesson, or skill is enacted, embodied, or realized
- Process philosophy – Philosophical approach
