= Germann =

Germann is a surname. Notable people with the surname include:

- Adolf Germann (1857–1924), Swiss politician
- Albert Fredrick Ottomar Germann (1886–1976), American chemist
- Asa Germann (born 1997), American actor
- Frank Erhart Emmanuel Germann (1887–1974), American physicist
- Greg Germann (born 1958), American actor
- Hannes Germann (born 1956), Swiss politician
- Ken Germann (1921–2005), American athlete, coach, and administrator
- Kilian Germann (1485–1530), Prince abbot of St. Gall
- Markus Germann (born 1942), Swiss figure skater
- Monika Germann (born 1954), Swiss cross-country skier
- Paul Germann, Canadian sound effects editor
- Pierre Germann (born 1985), French footballer
- Theodor Germann (1879–1935), Latvian chess master
- Wilhelm Germann (1840–1902), German Protestant theologian and missionary
