= Arming yeast =

Arming yeast is a tool in biotechnology and biological research where a protein of interest is expressed on the surface of yeast cells. This is used in industrial settings for expression of enzymes to serve as catalysts in reactions, as well as in pharmaceutical settings for screening drug candidates. Saccharomyces cerevisiae is most commonly used as arming yeast because it is easy to grow, can be genetically manipulated, and is generally recognized as safe by the U.S. Food and Drug Administration.

== Mechanisms ==
The most common mechanism of arming yeast is to fuse a protein of interest to the extracellular domain of the yeast mating protein α-agglutinin.

== Uses ==
Arming yeast have been used for a variety of industrial and research processes. S. cerevisiae armed with a glucoamylase from Rhizopus oryzae have been used to break down starches in the production of ethanol. Similarly, yeast expressing endoglucanase from Trichoderma reesei as well as β-glucosidase from Aspergillus aculeatus were used to break down agricultural waste into material which can be turned into ethanol.

== See also ==
- Autodisplay
