= University of Münster School of Business and Economics =

Coordinates: 51.962°N 7.620°E

The School of Business and Economics (German: Wirtschaftswissenschaftliche Fakultät) at the University of Münster (WWU) is one of the leading educational establishments for economics and business in Germany with 6,000 students.

== History ==
In 1969, the School of Business and Economics evolved out of the former School of Law, Business and Economics at the University of Münster. Since 1902, the latter had itself offered all the courses relating to Law, Business Studies and Economics. During the 1960s, the number of students taking economics courses increased substantially. While there were 1,200 such students in 1960, the figure doubled in ten years to over 2,500. In 1969, in order to do justice to this development, as well as to the growing importance of economics in society, the School of Law, Business and Economics was divided into the School of Business and Economics and the Faculty of Law. In 1990 the Department of Information Systems was founded, because of the growing need for interdisciplinary research in Computer Science and Business Administration. In 2000 the Department of Economic Education was established due to the growing need for economic education from students from other fields of study. In 2006 the School initiated the AACSB accreditation and mastered successfully the accreditation in 2011. In 2019 the School of Business and Economics celebrated its 50th anniversary.

The school conducts interdisciplinary research with other schools of the University of Münster (for example: Law, Computer Science, Communication Science, Psychology, Medicine (Neuroeconomics, Management), Chemistry and Pharmacy), which have led to new courses and field of studies. It houses the European Research Center for Information Systems, which is a leading research network.

=== Alumni ===
For a list of notable alumni and scientists see List of Westphalian Wilhelms-University Münster people. The school offers also electronic access to its alumni' CVs to companies which pay for access.

=== Associated Research Centers ===
- European Research Center for Information Systems (ERCIS)
- Marketing Center Münster (MCM)
- Accounting Center Münster (ACM)
- Finance Center Münster (FCM)
- Center for Management (CfM)
- Center for Applied Economic Research Münster (CAWM) (Centrum für angewandte Wirtschaftsforschung Münster)
- Center for Quantitative Economics (CQE)
- Center for Economic Theory (CET)
- Center for Interdisciplinary Economics (CIW)

== Fields of study ==
The School of Business and Economics offers many (often postgraduate) courses in English and the following Bachelor, Master, Doctorate, Habilitation research programmes

- Business Administration (Bachelor of Science, Master of Science, Doctorate, Habilitation) - In German: Betriebswirtschaftslehre. Note: There are several lectures taught in English (more lectures in English in the postgraduate degrees).
- Economics (Bachelor of Science, Master of Science, Doctorate, Habilitation) - In German: Volkswirtschaftslehre. Note: There are several lectures taught in English (more lectures in English in the postgraduate degrees).
- Information systems (Bachelor of Science, Master of Science, Doctorate, Habilitation) - In German: Wirtschaftsinformatik. Note: The Master of Science degree is completely taught in English.
- Economics and Law (Bachelor of Science) - In German: Wirtschaft und Recht
- Political- and Economic Science (Bachelor of Arts) - In German: Politik und Wirtschaft

And the following postgraduate courses:

- MBA in Marketing
- Executive Programme in Information Management
- Accounting and Management Accounting Program
- Executive MBA Business Management
- Master's Degree Course in Accounting and Auditing
- Master's Degree Course in Energy Economics
- Master's Degree Course in Data Science

Before the Bologna process the University awarded the Diplom (Univ.) (Diplom-Kaufmann, Diplom-Kauffrau, Diplom-Volkswirt, Diplom-Volkswirtin, Diplom-Wirtschaftsinformatiker) which is equivalent to a Master's degree.

== See also ==
- University of Münster
