= Burandt Lake =

Lake in the state of Minnesota, United States

- Location within Minnesota
- Location: Carver County, Minnesota
- Coordinates: 44°50′57″N 93°48′17″W
- Type: lake

Burandt Lake is a lake in Carver County, Minnesota, bordering the city of Waconia. It is 97 acres in size and approximately 24 feet deep at its deepest point. It was named for Adolph Burandt, a local farmer.

The lake once was characterized by high levels of phosphorus that caused algae blooms, a situation that became the subject of remediation efforts that were underway by 2016.
