= Friedhelm Gehrmann =

German academic

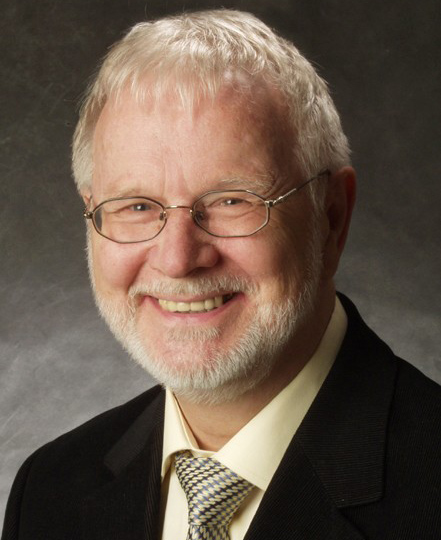
Friedhelm Gehrmann

Friedhelm Gehrmann (born 12 June 1939 in Dortmund) is a German scientist in the field of economics and social sciences. Since 1981, he has been teaching and consulting in the fields of “International Knowledge and Technology Transfer.” At present, he is the director of the institutes “Global Consulting and Government” and “Renewable Energy, Technology and Management” at Steinbeis-Hochschule Berlin.

== Biography ==
Gehrmann studied economics and social sciences from 1960 till 1966 at the Universities of Saarbruecken, Vienna and Muenster. After completing his PhD in 1969 at the University of Munster, Gehrmann began his work as a scientific fellow at the Universities of Muenster and Augsburg and was there until 1973. He then began his career as a visiting researcher at United Nations in Geneva (Economic Commission for Europe) for the subject “ Measurement of regional disparities in urban and regional policy, documented by economic, social and environmental indicators” from 1974 till 1976. From 1976 till 1980, Gehrmann was a full-time desk-officer manager, both in Federal Statistical Office and in State Government of Hesse. In 1980, he was offered and accepted a chair at the Federal University of Applied Administrative Sciences (Bruehl/ Bonn). During this time, he undertook several time-limited delegations to Federal Ministries in Bonn for highly specialised issues in economic, social and environmental fields. After Germany’s reunification, Gehrmann accepted a chair at the Bauhaus University in Weimar from 1990 till 1996. At the same time, he was a consultant to Germany’s “Privatisation Agency” (Treuhandanstalt). From 1996 to 1998, he worked on a 2-years-stay in a task-force in the Federal Ministries of “Interior” and “Labour” for a special function in long-term economic affairs.

Since 2004, Gehrmann has been working at the Steinbeis University Berlin. He is active as the director of the institutes “Global Consulting and Government” and “Renewable Energy, Technology and Management”.

The major focus of the consulting activities in 2011 till 2012 was the consultation of several Ministries and state authorities in Kazakhstan, for instance MINT (Ministry of Industry and New Technologies) and NATD (National Agency for Technological Development). Additionally, Gehrmann was an appointed member of the preparatory committee of the conferences “Astana Economic Forum” and “World Anti-crisis Conference Astana”; both conferences took place under the patronage of United Nations General Assembly (New York). Beyond the University arena, Gehrmann is the managing director of IKAT Ltd (International Knowledge and Technology Ltd.) which he founded in 2012. The company is focused on consultations in International Knowledge and Technology Transfer.

== Major research and consulting fields ==
After receiving his PhD, Gehrmann began researching empirical survey and measurement of business cycles indicators and business surveys. After, from 1973 till 1994, his research focused on “Social indicators, social reporting and environmental indicators”. Additionally, “Urban and regional research in emerging markets” was also an area of research. Since 1989, the issues “Economic consulting and technology transfer in emerging markets” became his most important research focus. Because of the rapid development in information and communication technologies from 1993 till 2003, the new subjects “e-learning, e-Government and e-business” received first priority in his research.

Since 2003, Gehrmann has been a member in “Steinbeis-Conglomerate”, which consists of (1) Steinbeis Foundation, (2) Steinbeis Technology Transfer Ltd. and (3) Steinbeis University Berlin. At the University, Gehrmann is the managing director of the Steinbeis institutes' “Global Consulting and Government” and “Renewable Energy, Technology and Management” with branches and contact person in Cairo, Tripoli, Tehran, Moscow, Astana, Shanghai and Singapore. Because of the manifold executed consultations referring “concepts in job-related qualification” – with special reference to emerging markets – the new topic “Tools for interactive multimedia-based teaching and learning methods in digital age” became more and more important. The current major research area is, since 2012, the analysis and evaluation of “Technology-Leap-Frogging” with special reference to the issue “Consequences and effects of High-Tech-Implementation in emerging countries”. Since 1972, Gehrmann has undertaken manifold research and lecturing trips to the USA, Canada, Soviet Union/ Russia, Egypt, Libya, Iran, Oman, Tunisia, Morocco, Turkey, Kazakhstan as well as many European countries.

== Bibliography ==
- Konkurse im Industrialisierungsprozess Deutschlands 1810-1913. Diss., Westfälische Univ. Münster, FB Wirtschafts- und Sozialwissenschaft 1973
- Zur Frage der dynamischen Gestaltung der Konjunkturindikatoren. In: Bernd Biervert, Karl-Heinz Schaffartzig und Günter Schmölders (Hg.), Konsum und Qualität des Lebens. Opladen 1974: S. 199 - 236
- Anmerkungen zur Frage der Auswirkungen des Aussenhandels auf Einkommensverteilung und Wachstumszyklen. In: Bernhard Gahlen (Hg.), Wachstumszyklen und Einkommensverteilung. Tübingen 1974: S. 299 - 325
- Einkommen und Konsum alter Menschen. In: Helga Reimann und Horst Reimann (Hg.), Das Alter. München 1974: S. 87 - 102
- Die Versorgung mit Alteneinrichtungen im Stadt-Umland-Verflechtungsraum. In: Alternativen für die Verstädterung Europas, Hg. von Katrin Lederer und Rainer Mackensen, Berlin 1975: S. A41 ff.
- The usefulness of the “quality-of-life” concept as a tool for Social Planning. Report prepared for “Vienna Center” on behalf of UNESCO: Round-table meeting on “Quality of Life”. Budapest 1975, published in Proceedings of UNESCO
- Urban development indicators of measuring the performance of urban systems. Report prepared for the expert group meeting of Quality of Urban Development, held at United Nations Center for Housing, Building and Planning, 1975 Published in Proceedings of United Nations.
- Informations- und Steuerungsinstrumente zur Schaffung einer höheren Lebensqualität in Städten. Vandenhoeck + Ruprecht Gm, Göttingen 1976, ISBN 3-525-11314-5
- Measuring infrastructure disparities in the 60 largest German cities. Report presented to OECD Special Meeting on “Urban Environmental Indicators”, Environment Directorate. Published in Proceedings of OECD. 1976
- Indikatoren zur Infrastrukturausstattung in Frankfurt, Wiesbaden, Kassel, Offenbach und Darmstadt. In: Institut Wohnen und Umwelt (Hg.) Darmstadt 1976
- Sozialindikatoren zur Erfassung des Versorgungsniveaus: Die Versorgung mit Einrichtungen für alte Menschen. In : Wolfgang Zapf (Hg.), Gesellschaftspolitische Zielsysteme. Soziale Indikatoren IV. Frankfurt 1976
- Traditionelle und anwendungsorientierte Indikatoren zur Ermittlung ausgewählter Infrastrukturparitäten, dargestellt am Beispiel der 60. Grossstädte der BDR. Campus Verlag, Frankfurt 1977, ISBN 3-593-32204-8
- Problematik der Festlegung und Operationalisierung von Normwerten zur Erfassung von Infrastrukturdisparitäten. Campus Verlag, Frankfurt 1978, ISBN 3-593-32332-X
- Methodologische Probleme der Konstruktion international vergleichbarer Indikatoren. Campus Verlag, Frankfurt 1980, ISBN 3-593-32636-1
- Erwartungen von Arbeitnehmern an Sozialbilanzen : Ergebnisse einer empirischen Erhebung. Campus Verlag, Frankfurt 1981, ISBN 3-593-32752-X
- Ansprüche an die Arbeit. Umfragedaten und Interpretationen. Soziale Indikatoren XI. Campus Verlag, Frankfurt 1987, ISBN 3-593-33390-2
- Vom Anspruchs- zum Verzichtdenken: Fakten und Meinungen. Soziale Indikatoren XII. Campus Verlag, Frankfurt 1985, ISBN 3-593-33509-3
- Arbeitsmoral und Technikfeindlichkeit: Über demoskopische Fehlschlüsse. Soziale Indikatoren XIII. Campus Verlag, Frankfurt 1986, ISBN 3-593-33757-6
- Arbeitszeit-Flexibilisierung : tarifpolitische Erfahrungen und neue Modelle in Westdeutschland, Österreich und der Schweiz. Campus Verlag, Frankfurt 1987, ISBN 3-593-33831-9
- Neue Informations- und Kommunikationstechnologien: Ansätze einer gesellschaftsbezogenen Technologieberichterstattung. Campus Verlag, Frankfurt 1987, ISBN 3-593-33776-2
- Praktische Ansatzpunkte für ein Bau-Marketing in mittelständischen Bauunternehmen. In Friedhelm Gehrmann (Hg), Baumarketing in mittelständischen Unternehmen, Weimar 1994: S. 51 - 110
- Besonderheiten der Sanierung von Pflegeeinrichtungen in Plattenbauweise. In Kooperation mit dem Thüringischen Ministerium für Soziales und Gesundheit und der Deutschen Gesellschaft für Gerontologie und Geriatrie. Weimar 1996
- with Heiko Schinzer and Alfred Tacke Public E-Procurement. Netzbasierte Beschaffung für öffentliche Auftraggeber und Versorgungungsunternehmen. Vahlen, Munich 2002, ISBN 3-800-62842-2
- Early detection of innovation and technology trends in times of ongoing modernisation and restructuring. – Report and lecture prepared for “World Anti-crisis Conference”. Astana 2013

== See also ==
- Website der Steinbeis-Universität Berlin
- Bildungswerk Unternehmerschaft Niederrhein GmbH
- Eintrag auf der Website der IKAT GmbH
