= Gehman =

Gehman is a surname. Notable people with the surname include:

- Don Gehman, American record producer, best known for his work in the 1980s with John Mellencamp
- Harold W. Gehman, Jr., retired United States Navy four-star admiral who served as NATO's Supreme Allied Commander
- Hilary Gehman (born 1971), American rower from Shirley, Massachusetts
- Martha Gehman, American actress, known for her role as Ophelia in the 1985 cult classic The Legend of Billie Jean
- Pleasant Gehman (born 1959), magazine writer, poet, actor, dancer and musician from Los Angeles
- Richard Gehman (1921–1972), prolific American author of 3,000 magazine articles, five novels and fifteen nonfiction books

== Other ==
- John Gehman Farm was listed on the National Register of Historic Places in 1992
