= Wolfgang Burandt =

German legal scholar

Wolfgang Burandt (born 1957) is a German lawyer, mediator, legal academic and professor for commercial law at the Nordakademie - Graduate School.

== Life ==
Wolfgang Burandt studied law at the University of Hamburg, the London School of Economics and Political Science (LSE), the Universiteit van Amsterdam, the Columbia University, New York and the McGill University, Montréal. In 1984 he completed his legal clerkship at the Canadian German chamber of industry and commerce, Montreal (Quebec) and Toronto (Ontario); the German University of Administrative Sciences, Speyer; the legal department of the Hamburg Parliament; the legal department of the Dresdner Bank AG in Hamburg, the district court Hamburg and the appellate court Hamburg. He completed it successfully in 1987 with his second state exam in Hamburg. From 1987 to 1990 he worked as research associate at the University of the Federal Armed Forces Hamburg in the department for commercial- and organisational science, at the chair for civil, commercial, and corporate law. Since 1990 he is an independent freelance lawyer in Hamburg. From 1992 to 1997 he foremost worked as liquidator, sequestrator, consultant and assignee in bankruptcy. In 1998 he successfully completed a further training as executor (DVEV). 1999 he received his doctor's degree. In the year 2000 he qualified as an expert for family law. After 18 months of training in Hamburg and Heidelberg he qualified as a mediator (BAFM) in the year 2002 and completed his studies in the field of "mergers and acquisitions" at the University of Münster, Münster, in 2003 with the degree of a Master of Laws, LL.M. In 2004 he completed his further studies at the University of Wales/Cardiff in the field of "Financial Services" with an MBA. In the same year he became a lecturer for business law at the Nordakademie - Graduate School. In 2005 Burandt finished his third post-graduate studies, at the Viadrina European University in Frankfurt (Oder) with the degree Master of Arts, M.A. in the field of mediation and was elected the first chairman of the specialist solicitor committee for the law of succession at the hanseatic bar association in Hamburg. In 2006 he qualified as a specialist for inheritance law. 2007 he became an honorary professor for commercial law at the Nordakademie - Graduate School and a visiting lecturer for mediation at the University of Münster, Münster. 2008 he joined the law firm SES Schlutius Eulitz Schrader in Hamburg, which in 2009 joined the co-partnership SKW Schwarz Rechtsanwälte, Wirtschaftsprüfer, Steuerberater based in Berlin, Düsseldorf, Frankfurt/Main, Hamburg and Munich. In 2012 Burandt qualified as a specialist for trade and company law. Since 2015 Burandt is working as a freelancing lawyer again. He joined the co-partnership of Römermann Rechtsanwalte AG as a partner. In 2016 Burandt joined the Wire Institute as associated scientific member.

== Publications (selection) ==
Burandt has over 600 publications, including as the editor- and has authored various specialized books, legal commentaries, and the monthly journal FuR – Familie und Recht (FUR) as well as the membership in the advisory board of the monthly journal ZErb – Zeitschrift für die Steuer- und Erbrechtspraxis.

- Burandt, Wolfgang/ Dutta, Anatol (eds.), International Law of Succession, C.H. Beck. Hart. Nomos, 2015, ISBN 978-3-406-64109-1.
- Burandt, Wolfgang / Rojahn, Dieter (eds.), Erbrecht, Kommentar in der Reihe "Beck'sche Kurzkommentare", C.H. Beck Verlag, München ISBN 978-3-406-60259-7.
- Burandt, Wolfgang, commentary on §§ 2274 - 2289 BGB, in: Deutscher Erbrechtskommentar, Große-Wilde, Franz M. und Ouart, Dr. Peter E. (eds.), Carl Heymanns Verlag, Köln 2010, ISBN 978-3-452-27147-1.
- Burandt, Wolfgang / Zacher-Röder, Unternehmertestament, C.H.Beck Verlag, 2. Auflage, München 2012, ISBN 978-3-406-64225-8.
- Burandt, Wolfgang (ed.) Beck'sches Mandatshandbuch "Erbrechtliche Unternehmensnachfolge", C.H.Beck Verlag, München 2002, ISBN 3-406-47844-1.
- Burandt, Wolfgang; Beratung im Erbrecht II - Nach dem Erbfall; C.F. Müller Verlag, Heidelberg, 2002, ISBN 3-8114-2367-3
- Burandt, Wolfgang; Beratung im Erbrecht I - Vor dem Erbfall; C.F.Müller Verlag, Heidelberg, 2001, ISBN 3-8114-2366-5
