= Center for Monitoring, Analysis and Strategy =

German extremism monitoring agency

- Formation: March 2021; 4 years ago
- Headquarters: Berlin, Germany
- Website: cemas.io

The Center for Monitoring, Analysis and Strategy (CeMAS) is a German non-profit extremism monitoring agency established in 2021. Its stated focus is on creating an early warning system against conspiracy ideologies, disinformation and far-right extremism.

== Overview ==
The Center for Monitoring, Analysis and Strategy was established in March 2021 by political data scientist Josef Holnburger and social psychologist Pia Lamberty, with the intent of developing an early warning system against conspiracy ideologies, disinformation and far-right extremism. The other founding members are senior researchers Miro Dittrich and Jan Rathje, and cognitive scientist Rocío Rocha Dietz. It is based in Berlin and is funded by the Alfred Landecker Foundation, which provided the organization with €2.8 million. The organization tracks far-right activity on Telegram.

During the 2021 German federal election, CeMAS found that false claims of voter fraud had become commonplace on Telegram in Germany, with accusations against Dominion Voting Systems being common despite the company's technology not being used in German elections. Dittrich said, "We have seen far-right actors try to claim election fraud since at least 2016, but it didn't take off. When Trump started telling the 'big lie,' it became a big issue in Germany, sometimes bigger than the pandemic, because far-right groups and the AfD are carefully monitoring the success Trump is having with this narrative."

CeMAS staff are consulted by many media outlets as experts on topics such as conspiracy theories, Russian propaganda, Reich citizens and anti-Semitism.

In 2023, CeMAS was presented with the Philipp Morris Power for Democracy Award for outstanding democratic engagement.
