= Private University in the Principality of Liechtenstein =

Private medical school located in Liechtenstein

Coordinates: 47.1082°N 9.5266°E

Private University in the Principality of Liechtenstein (UFL)
- Motto: "Kluge Köpfe denken voraus"
- Type: University
- Established: 2000; 26 years ago
- Dean: Barbara Gant
- Faculty: 2 Chairs
- Location: Triesen, Principality of Liechtenstein
- Study programs: PhD Program in Medical Sciences; PhD Program in Law
- Colors: Blue, Red and Yellow
- Website: ufl.li

The Private University in the Principality of Liechtenstein (German: Private Universität im Fürstentum Liechtenstein (UFL)) is one of the four centers for higher education in the Principality of Liechtenstein. It focuses on two main fields of study: Medical Sciences and Law. The university is located in Triesen. The university has partnerships with over 20 other institutions in the rest of the world.

== History ==
The university was founded in 2000 as University for Human Sciences in the Principality of Liechtenstein (German: Universität für Humanwissenschaften im Fürstentum Liechtenstein). In 2007, the Law School was established, and the university was renamed.

Besides numerous law courses, the university still has its focus on medical research. It offers doctoral courses in medical science, which are eligible for candidates with master's degrees in medicine, medical technology, biomedical engineering, biology, and related disciplines.

There are four research institutes and one research centre at the UFL, which are the Institute for Laboratory Medicine, the Institute for Translational Medicine, the Institute for Liechtenstein Law and Legal Theory, the Institute for European and International Law, and the ‘UFL International Center for Intellectual Property and Innovation Law’.

In 2023, just under a third of the Dr. iur. students were women, while 46% of Dr. scient. med. of students were women. The university has approximately 250 students.

== Study programs ==
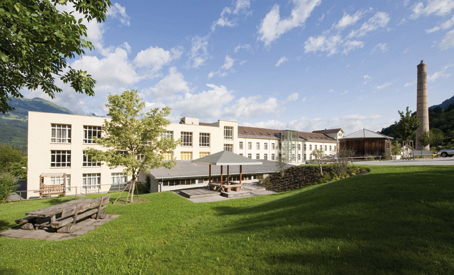
Private University in the Principality of Liechtenstein

- Doctoral programs in Medical Sciences, students are awarded the German PhD equivalent Dr. scient. med.
- Doctoral programs in Law, students are awarded the German PhD equivalent Dr. iur.
