= Ken Germann =

American athlete, coach, and administrator (1921–2005)

Biographical details
- Born: April 16, 1921; Brooklyn, New York, U.S.
- Died: August 24, 2005 (aged 84); Richmond, Virginia, U.S.

Playing career

Football
- 1940–1942: Columbia
- Positions: Wingback, punter (football)

Coaching career (HC unless noted)

Football
- 1946–1956: Iona Prep (NY)
- 1957–1960: Columbia (freshmen)

Administrative career (AD unless noted)
- 1946–1957: Iona Prep (NY)
- 1961–1968: Rutgers (assistant AD)
- 1968–1973: Columbia
- 1974–1987: SoCon (commissioner)

Kenneth George Germann (April 16, 1921 – August 24, 2005) was an American college athlete, football coach, and college athletics administrator. He served as the athletic director at Columbia University from 1968 to 1973. Germann was the commissioner of the Southern Conference from 1974 to 1987.

== Biography ==
Germann was born in Brooklyn on April 16, 1921. He graduated from Columbia College in 1943. At Columbia, he was a wingback and punter for a team led by all-American quarterback Paul Governali. He set the record at Columbia with 41.6 yards per punt in 1941 that has not been broken for 60 years.

He was drafted by Buffalo Bills in 1943, but opted to join the army, where he became a captain and helped coach the Fleet Marine Force football team with NFL star Cliff Battles. He later decided to become a coach and forwent the chance to play in the All-America Football Conference. He first coached Iona Preparatory School after his 1946 discharge and spent 11 years there. He spent four years as the freshman coach at Columbia University, another seven years at Rutgers University as the assistant director and light football coach before becoming the Athletic director of Columbia Lions. During his tenure at Columbia, he spearheaded the drive to build the Dodge Physical Fitness Center, named after university alumnus and trustee Marcellus Hartley Dodge Sr., graduate of the class of 1903.

After Columbia, Germann left to become the commissioner of the Southern Conference, where he served from 1974 until his retirement in 1987. Under his watch, the conference expanded its women's athletic programs. The top award for the best performing women's team, Germann Cup, is named after him.

He died on August 24, 2005, in Glen Ellen, Virginia.
