= Corliss Orville Burandt =

American engineer

Corliss Orville Burandt is an American engineer who invented a system of variable valve timing in automobile engines. Working through a 1965 Chevrolet Corvair, he designed a system of putting a sensor into the cylinder to optimize the fuel-air mixture during combustion. He claims that the hybrid autos, which are on the market today, use technology from his patents.

Burandt assigned the rights to his most cherished invention to Investment Rarities, a venture capital company which specialized in gold trading. When Investment Rarities had financial and tax setbacks in the late 1980s, it ceased paying the maintenance fees on Burandt's patents. Thus, the patents fell into the public domain.

After his patents came to naught, Burandt fell upon hard times. Living with obsessive–compulsive disorder (OCD), he says "I mean, I lost everything. I lost my house, I lost all my cars. I lost everything. I was fricking homeless. I lived in that goddamn car for a while. I mean, how many inventors live in their prototypes? I mean, is that ridiculous or what? It was just...I ruined my family with the deal. But in terms of what happened to me: basically, I was left to rot for eight years."

== Patents ==
- U.S. patent 4,961,406, Method and device for optimizing the air-fuel mixture burn rate of internal combustion engines during low speed, light and heavy load operating conditions, October 9, 1990
- U.S. patent 4,724,809, Method and apparatus utilizing valve throttling and charge stratification in the operation of an internal combustion engine, February 16, 1988
- U.S. patent 4,723,515, Mechanism utilizing a single rocker arm for controlling an internal combustion engine valve, February 9, 1988
- U.S. patent 4,683,848, Apparatus utilizing a plural-profiled cam unit for actuating the valve of an internal combustion engine, August 4, 1987
- U.S. patent 4,638,772, Valve actuating apparatus for minimizing the need for lash adjustment, January 27, 1987
- U.S. patent 4,495,902, Mechanism for variably controlling an internal combustion engine valve, January 29, 1985
- U.S. patent 4,484,558, Variable fuel delivery system for internal combustion, November 27, 1984
- U.S. patent 4,484,546, Variable valve operating mechanism for internal combustion engines, November 27, 1984
- U.S. patent 4,459,946, Valve actuating apparatus utilizing a multi-profiled cam unit for controlling internal combustion engines, July 17, 1984
- U.S. patent 4,438,737, Apparatus and method for controlling the valve operation of an internal combustion engine, March 27, 1984
- U.S. patent 4,438,735, Apparatus and timing mechanism for controlling the valve operation of an internal combustion engine, March 27, 1984
- U.S. patent 4,414,931, Variable valve operating mechanism for internal combustion engines, November 15, 1983
