= University of Liechtenstein =

University

Coordinates: 47.1498°N 9.5162°E

- Other name: UniLi
- Motto: Study with prospect
- Type: Public
- Established: 1961; 65 years ago
- Affiliations: IBH [Internationale Bodensee-Hochschule]
- President: Christian Frommelt
- Academic staff: 200
- Students: 800
- Location: Vaduz, Liechtenstein
- Website: www.uni.li

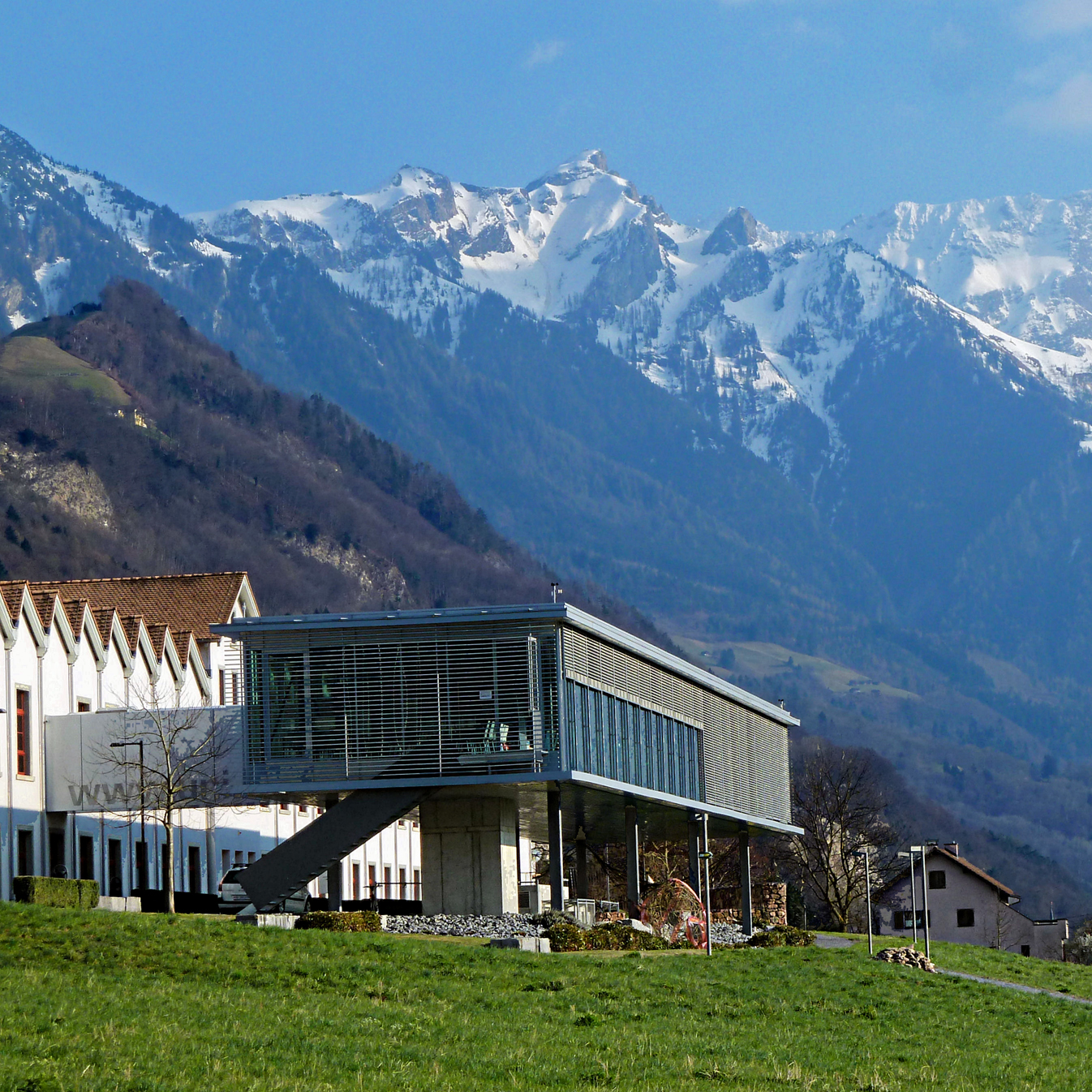
University of Liechtenstein

The University of Liechtenstein (UniLi, German: Universität Liechtenstein) is a public research university located in Vaduz, serving as the national university of the Principality of Liechtenstein. It focuses on two fields of study – architecture and business economics (entrepreneurship, finance, information systems, business law). The students and faculty come from 40 countries, and the university has partnerships with 80 other institutions.

== History ==
The university was founded in 1961 as Abendtechnikum mainly for the teaching of mechanical and civil engineers which later evolved into the Liechtenstein School of Engineering.

In 1998 the establishment was formally recognized as the Liechtenstein University of Applied Sciences (Fachhochschule Liechtenstein) and became the Hochschule Liechtenstein in 2005. In 2008 the institution derived the status as a university and received the right to offer doctoral programmes in addition to bachelor's and master's programmes according to the Bologna process. This included further extensions of the university and research programmes with other universities. In November 2010 the Liechtenstein Parliament adopted the law on the University of Liechtenstein that has been ratified on 1 February 2011.

In October 2016, Jürgen Brücker succeeded Klaus Näscher, who co-founded the university, as president. Brücker was formerly a member of the President's Board and Management Board of the University of St. Gallen. In October 2019, Ulrike Baumöl became rector; she was formerly the chair in information systems at University of Hagen. In April 2021 Markus Jäger replaced Baumöl as rector.

== Institutes and associated institutes ==
- Architecture and Planning
- Entrepreneurship
- Finance
- Information Systems and more
- Business Law
- KMU Zentrum

== Degree programmes ==
The study programmes at the University of Liechtenstein are structured according to the bachelor’s-master’s-doctorate system recognised worldwide in accordance with the Bologna Process.

=== Bachelor ===
The bachelor's degree programme leads to a first professional qualification at an institution of higher education. The bachelor programmes consist of at least six semesters (180 ECTS). The following academic degrees/titles are awarded:

- Bachelor of Science in Architecture – BSc Arch
- Bachelor of Science in Business Administration – BSc

=== Master ===
The master's degree programme provides specialization in the subject. The master programmes last for a minimum of four semesters (120 ECTS). The following academic degrees/titles are awarded:

- Master of Science in Architecture – MSc Arch
- Master of Science in Entrepreneurship – MSc
- Master of Science in Finance – MSc (previously: MSc Banking and Financial Management)
- Master of Science in Information Systems – MSc (previously: MSc Business Process Management)

The Master programme in Entrepreneurship was ranked 2nd in an international ranking (CH/AT/FL) in 2009. The Architecture programme received 1st place in 2008 in an international ranking (CH/AT/FL/DE) from the magazine DETAIL.

Students of the MSc Information systems programme won the 2015 and 2016 SAP DemoJam competition in Barcelona, which is the world’s biggest conference for SAP developers and designers. Starring in DemoJam 2015 was Kevin Flesher, Kevin Bösch, Rapha Credential, Bruno Saboia de Albuquerque and Bolaji Smith. The 2016 DemoJam participants were Roberts Zentelis, Carolina Martinez, Gaëtan Magal, Iliyan Iliev and Yanitsa Kircheva.

The Master of Finance programme is one of 56 CFA (Chartered Financial Analyst) recognized University programmes in Europe so the curriculum of the two are closely linked and students are able to participate in the annual CFA Institute Research Challenge. Students are also permitted to apply for a University-sponsored CFA exam scholarship along with the annual LGT (LGT Group) University Scholarship and the Banking Award Liechtenstein sponsored by the Liechtenstein Bankers Association.

=== Doctorate ===
The doctorate may be acquired in the third programme of studies:

- Doctor of Philosophy – PhD / DoktorIn der Wirtschaftswissenschaften – Dr. rer. oec.
- Doctor of Philosophy – PhD / DoktorIn der Wissenschaft – Dr. scient.

The doctorate programme lasts for a minimum of three years.

== Continuing education ==
The offerings include executive master’s, MBA, diploma and certificate programmes, symposiums and conferences, as well as lectures and seminars.

== Research ==
Institutes and research foci of the university are:

- Architecture and Planning: Sustainable Design, Architectural Design Theory and Sustainable Urban Design and Planning
- Entrepreneurship: Entrepreneurial Learning, Team Learning, Entrepreneurial Marketing, Innovation Management, International and Strategic Management, Knowledge Processing and Knowledge Management and Family Businesses
- Finance: Banking and Finance, International Taxation, Corporate Taxation, Asset Management
- Information Systems: Digital Innovation, Process Management, Sustainably Digital, Content Management, Enterprise Resource Planning, Big Data Analytics, Culture Assessment and Digital Nudging. The university is associated member in the European Research Center for Information Systems.
- Business Law: Company, Foundation and Trust Law, Banking and Securities Law

== Knowledge and technology transfers ==
Research documentation is supplied by research database information. All chairs and researchers, their research achievements, publications, research projects and partners are documented. The information also serves the purpose of research evaluation and can be found under R&D documentation on the university website.

== Tuition ==
The tuition for bachelor's, master's, and doctorate studies amounts to 950 CHF each semester (domestic, Swiss, EU/EWR). International students pay 1250 CHF each semester. Exchange students from the ERASMUS program pay tuition at their home universities and incur no extra tuition fees from the University of Liechtenstein.

== Travel information ==
The campus, located above Vaduz at the site of the former Spoerry cotton mill, is reached by public and private transportation.

== See also ==
- List of universities in Liechtenstein
