= IgA-specific metalloendopeptidase =

Class of enzymes

Identifiers
- EC no.: 3.4.24.13
- CAS no.: 72231-73-3

Databases
- IntEnz: IntEnz view
- BRENDA: BRENDA entry
- ExPASy: NiceZyme view
- KEGG: KEGG entry
- MetaCyc: metabolic pathway
- PRIAM: profile
- PDB structures: RCSB PDB PDBe PDBsum
Search
- PMC: articles
- PubMed: articles
- NCBI: proteins

IgA-specific metalloendopeptidase (EC 3.4.24.13, immunoglobulin A1 proteinase, IgA protease, IgA1-specific proteinase, IgA1 protease, IgA1 proteinase) is an enzyme. This enzyme catalyses the following chemical reaction:

Cleavage of Pro-Thr bond in the hinge region of the heavy chain of human immunoglobulin A

This enzyme is present in several pathogenic species of Streptococcus.

Other species, for instance bacteria that cause meningitis, gonorrhea, some cases of pneumonia, sinusitis and ear infections also produce an enzyme that cleaves IgA, but this is a serine protease and is metal-independent.
