= University of Münster =

Public university in Münster, North Rhine-Westphalia, Germany

- Universität Münster
- The seal of University of Münster
- Latin: Universitas Monasteriensis
- Type: Public
- Established: Jesuiten-Kolleg Münster 1588–1780; Universität Münster 16 April 1780; 246 years ago
- Affiliations: U15
- Budget: € 803.6 million (As of 2022)
- Chancellor: Matthias Schwarte
- Rector: Johannes Wessels
- Academic staff: 4,956
- Administrative staff: 1,924
- Students: 43,098 (As of 2024)
- Location: Münster, Northrhine-Westphalia, Germany; 51°57′49″N 07°36′49″E
- Campus: Urban, 285 buildings (2003)
- Colors: RAL 9004 & RAL 5021
- Website: www.uni-muenster.de

- Location within Germany Location within North Rhine-Westphalia

The University of Münster (German: Universität Münster, until 2023 German: Westfälische Wilhelms-Universität Münster, WWU) is a public research university located in the city of Münster, North Rhine-Westphalia in Germany.

With more than 43,000 students and over 120 fields of study in 15 departments, it is Germany's fifth largest university and one of the foremost centers of German intellectual life. The university offers a wide range of subjects across the sciences, social sciences and the humanities. Several courses are also taught in English, including PhD programmes as well as postgraduate courses in geoinformatics, geospational technologies or information systems.

Professors and former students have won ten Leibniz Prizes, the most prestigious as well as the best-funded prize in Germany, one Fields Medal and two Nobel Prizes. The University of Münster has also been successful in the German government's Excellence Initiative.

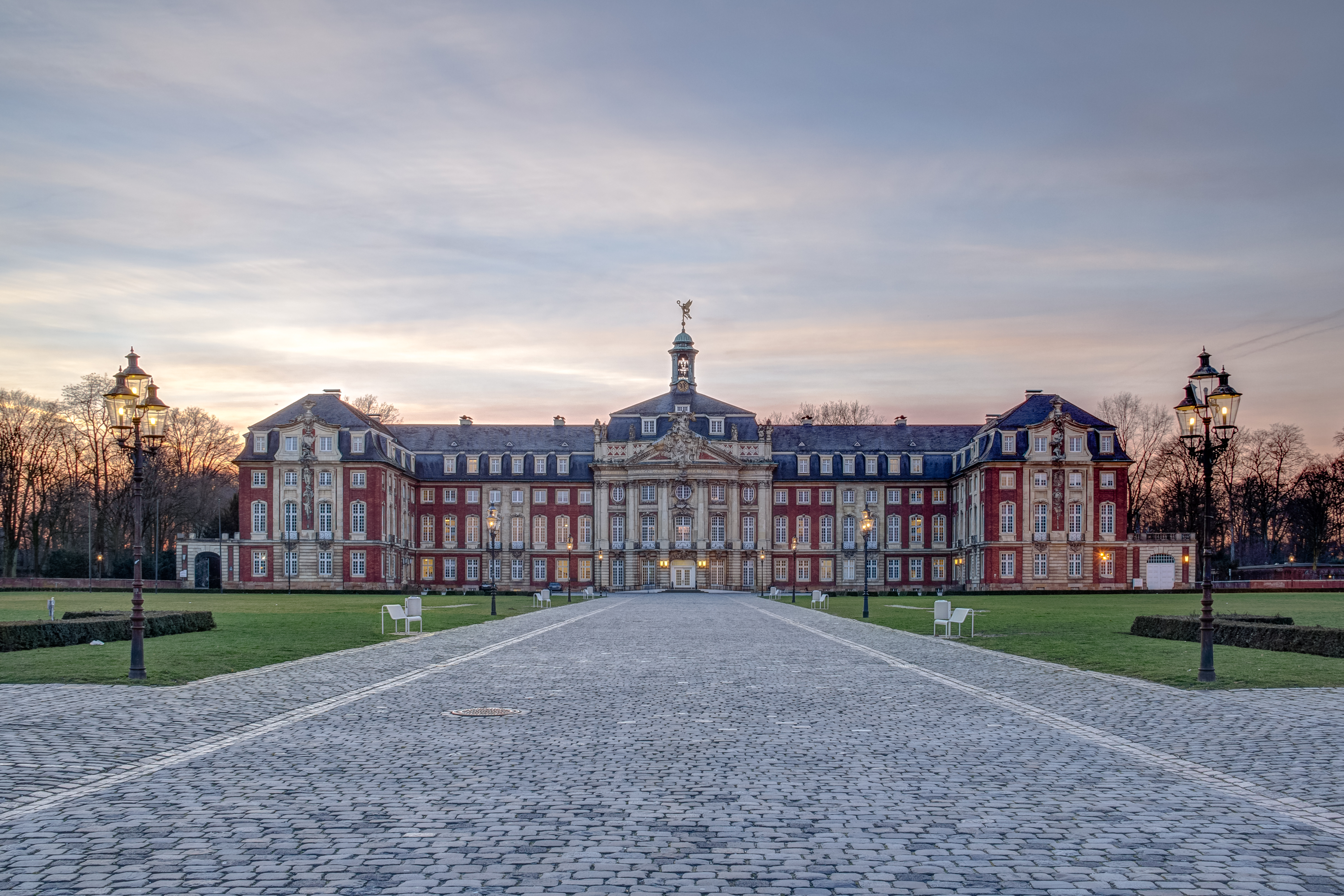
The Schloss is the administrative centre and the symbol of the university.

== History ==
The university has its roots in the Münster's Jesuit College (Jesuiten-Kolleg Münster), founded in 1588, and the convent of lay sisters Liebfrauen-Überwasser, founded in 1040, of which it took its seal. The convent was dissolved in 1773, so that its funds could be used to found the University of Münster on 16 April 1780.

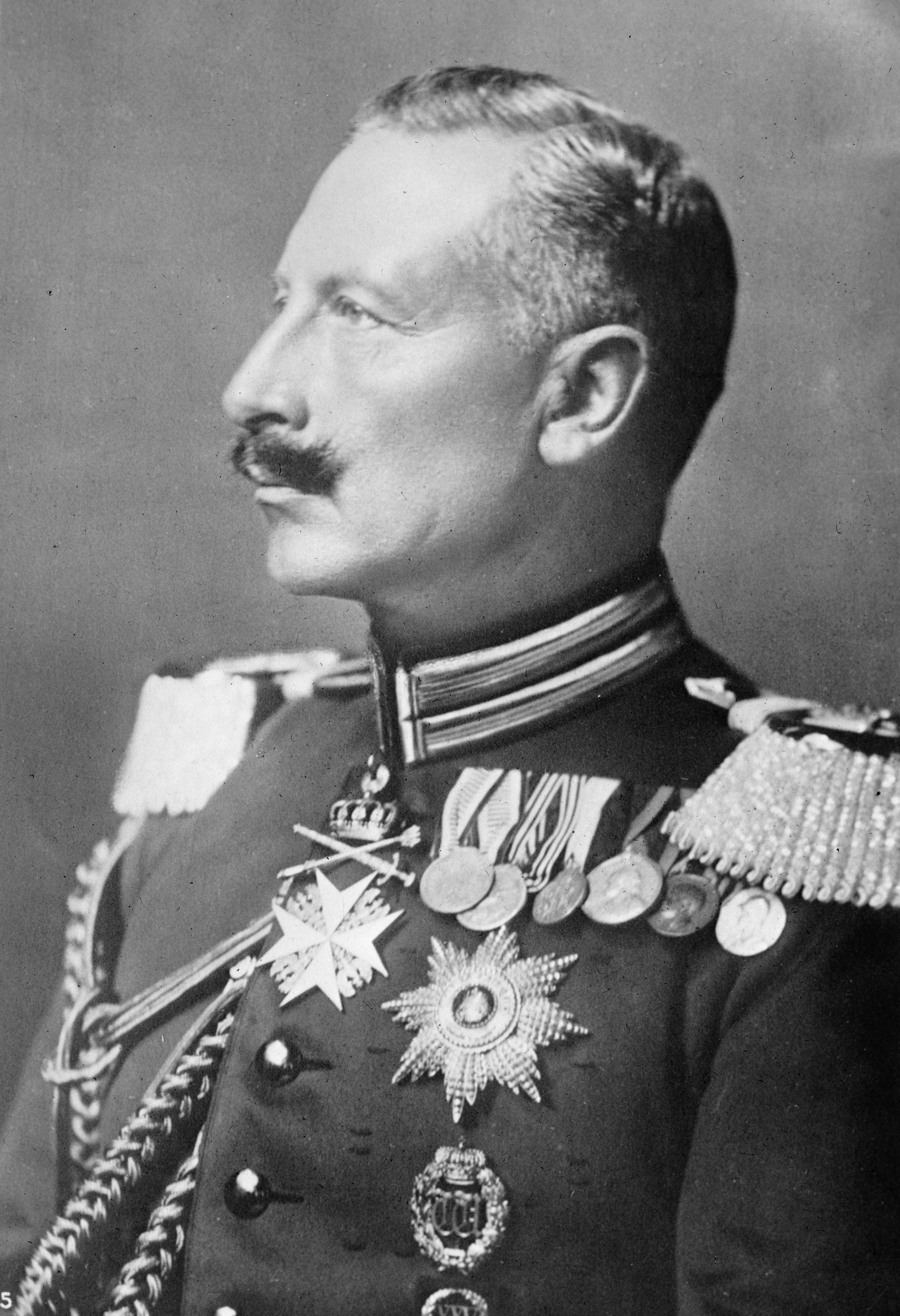
Emperor Wilhelm II of Germany, after whom the University of Münster was named prior to its name change in 2023

In 1631, Pope Urban VIII and Emperor Ferdinand II issued privileges, allowing the establishment of a university in Münster. However, due to a lack of funding, they were only put to use in 1780, when the modern University of Münster was founded with four faculties: Law, Medicine, Philosophy and Theology.

In 1843, it was renamed to Royal Theological and Philosophical Academy (Königliche Theologische und Philosophische Akademie), informally Münster Academy (Akademie Münster).

The ceremony of constitution was performed by Franz Freiherr von Fürstenberg. The university received the name Westphalian Wilhelm University (Westfälische Wilhelms-Universität Münster), from Emperor Wilhelm II on 22 August 1907. In 2023 the university was renamed as the University of Münster (Universität Münster).

=== European degrees ===
1999 saw the beginning of the Bologna Process, which aimed to ensure comparability in the standards and quality of higher education qualifications. The Münster School of Business Administration and Economics was the first one to establish bachelor's and master's degrees.

In the winter semester 2006/2007 nearly all studies have been changed according to Bachelor/Master system. Exceptions are made in studies leading to the Staatsexamen in medicine, dentistry, pharmacy and law.

== Academics ==
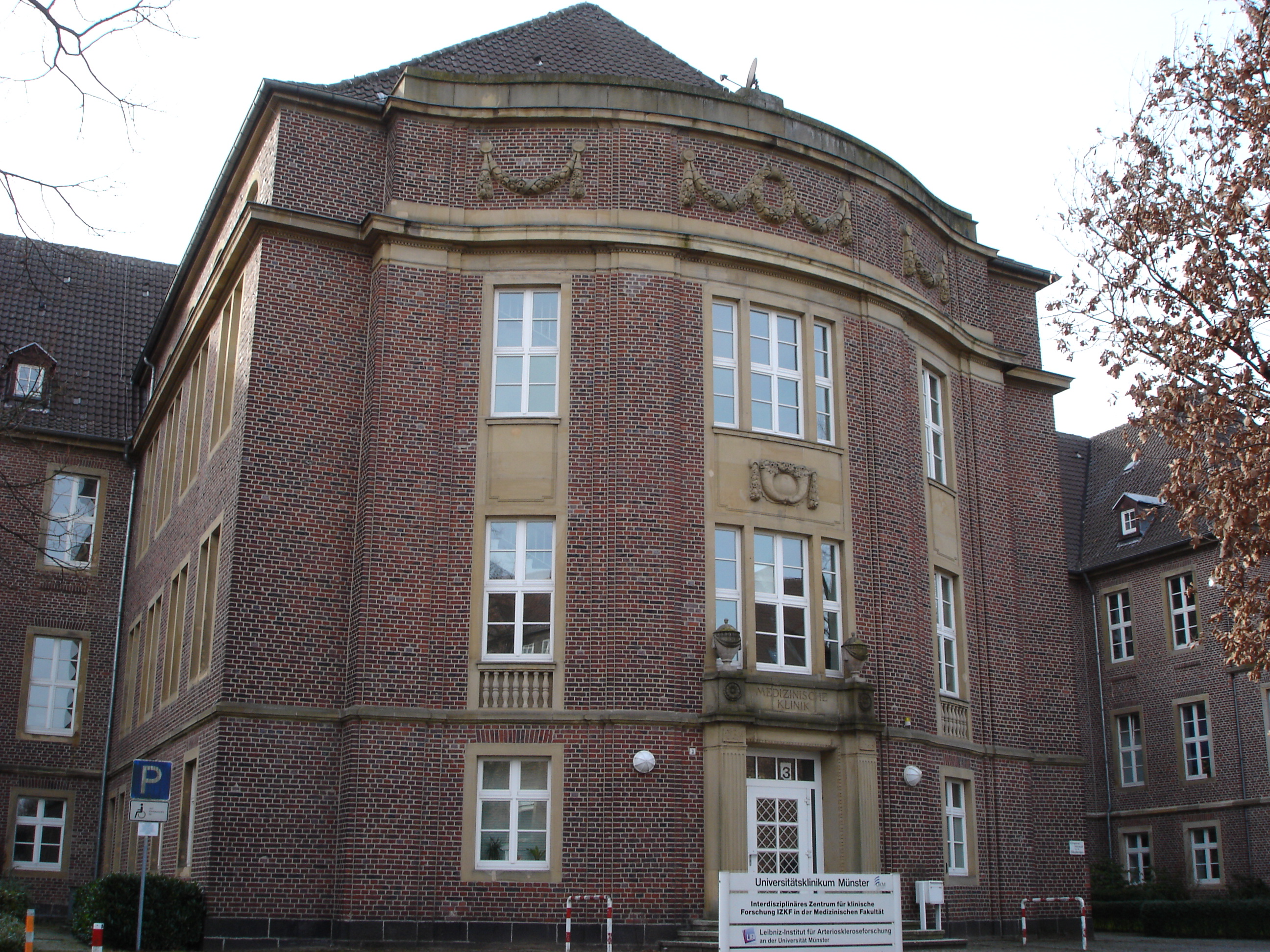
The Centre for Medical Research at the university

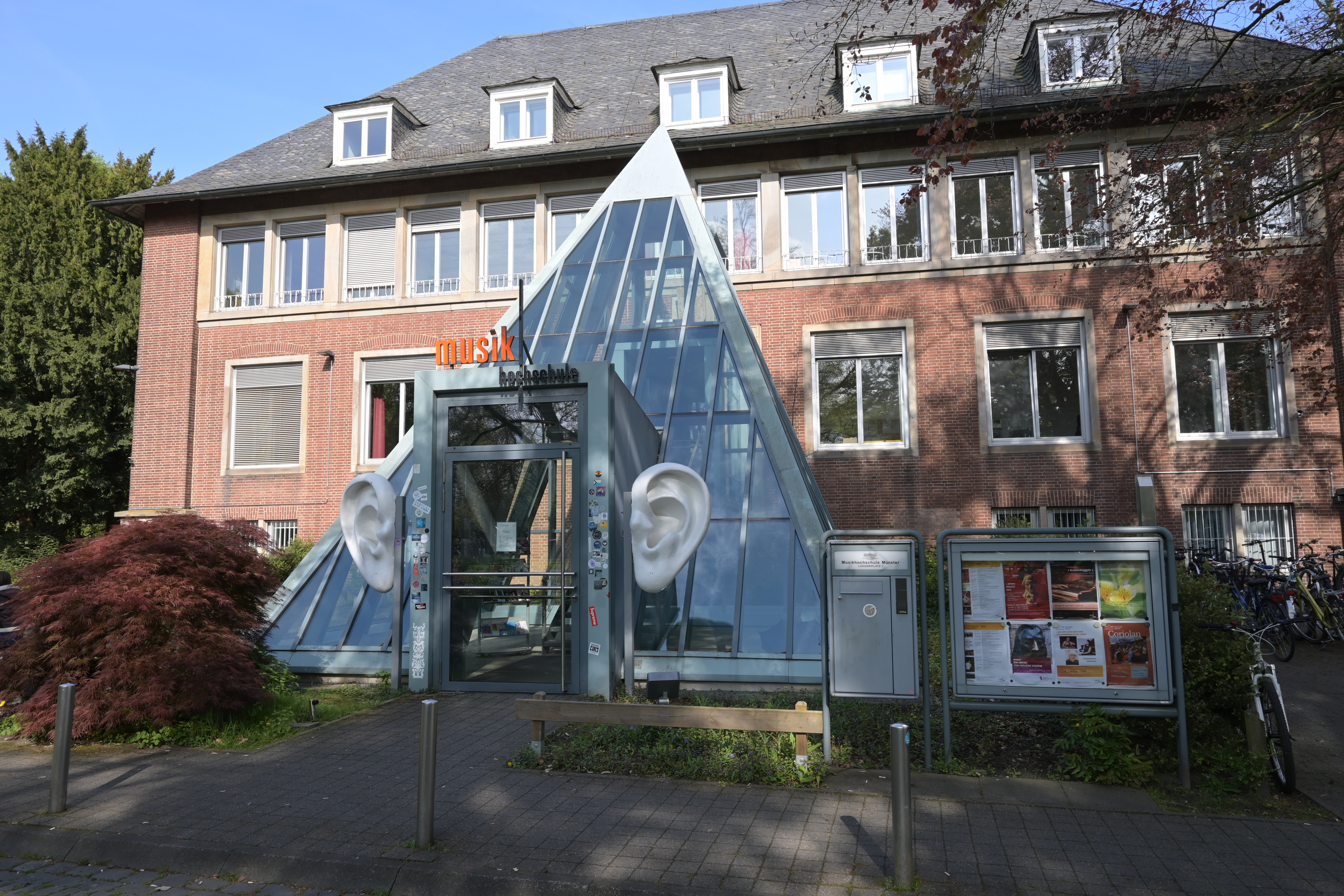
Music Conservatory

- Faculty of Protestant Theology
- Faculty of Catholic Theology
- Faculty of Law
- Faculty of Economics (Muenster School of Business Administration and Economics)
- Faculty of Health Science (Medicine and Dental Medicine)
- Faculty of Educational and Social Science
  - Institute of Communication Science (IfK) (PR, Journalism, Media Science)
- Faculty of Psychology and Sport Science
- Faculty of History/Philosophy
- Faculty of Philology
- Faculty of Mathematics and Computer Science
- Faculty of Physics
- Faculty of Chemistry and Pharmacy
- Faculty of Biology
- Faculty of Earth Science
- Faculty of Music (Musikhochschule Münster)

== Campus ==
The central library of the university is the Universitäts- und Landesbibliothek Münster (ULB), which is also the regional library of Westphalia. As of 2011, the library owns more than 6.2 million volumes of which 2.68 million volumes are held in the ULB, while 3.53 million volumes are held by the 146 faculty and department libraries. Of those, 47,350 are electronical articles and newspapers.

=== Points of interest ===
- Botanischer Garten Münster, the university's historic botanical garden

=== Student life ===
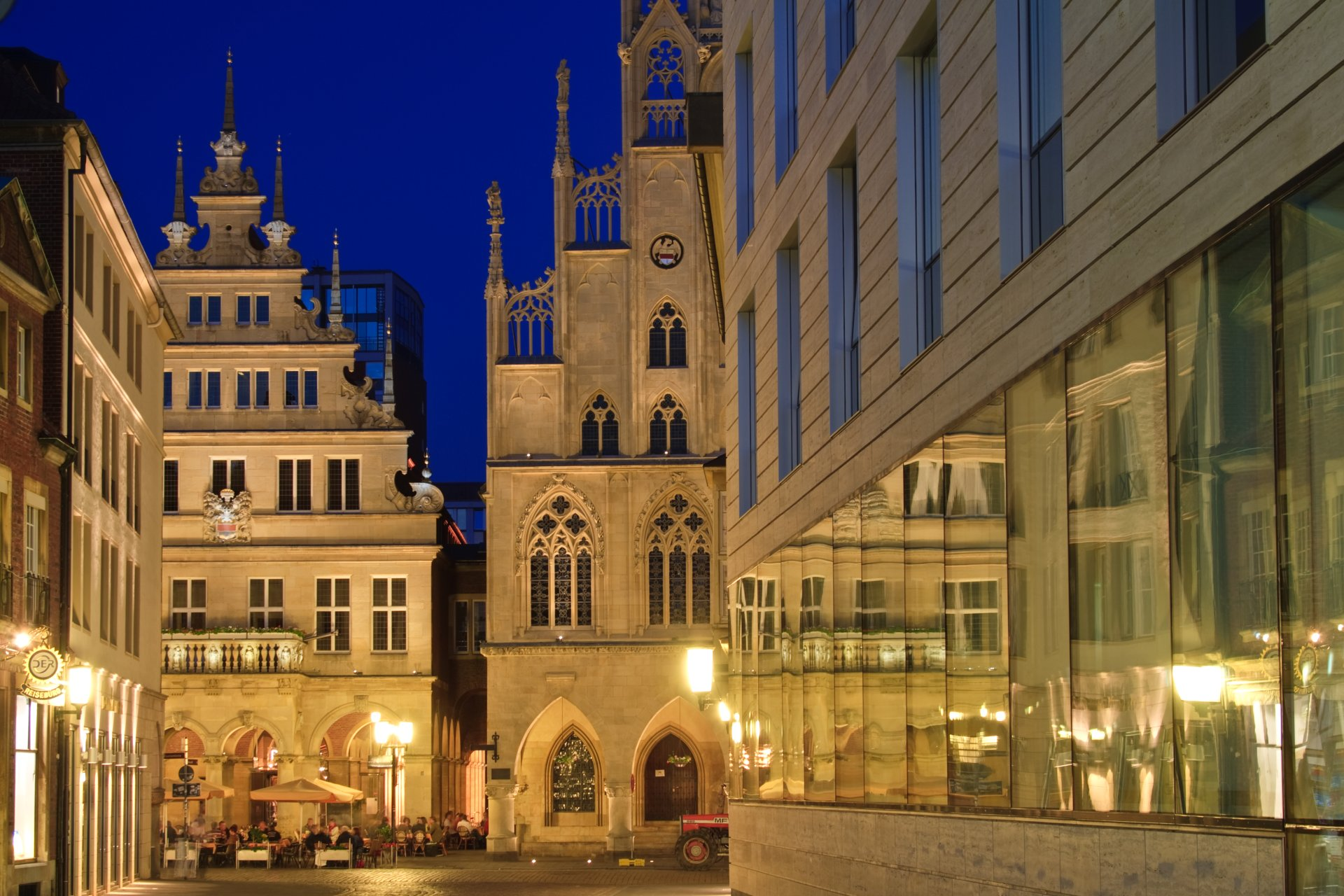
The city of Münster is regularly ranked as one of the most livable cities in the world.

The university offers a very active student life. The university's sports club ("Hochschulsport") offers more than 100 sport courses, sport tours, further education and international tournaments. The university's IT organization ("Zentrum für Informationsverarbeitung" (ZIV)) provides central services for information processing and communication technology. It offers IT facilities for the students with standard and special software. Foreign languages can be learned at the university's language center ("Sprachenzentrum"). It offers traditional language courses, tandem courses (two persons with different native languages meet in order to learn from each other) and language certificates (for example UNIcert). The cultural programme also includes various museums, music (choirs, ensembles, orchestra), theatres and cinemas. Student organisations such as AIESEC, AEGEE, move, MTP e.V. and many more are well represented with high membership. The city of Münster itself has a very active night life with more than 1,000 bars and clubs. As the city of the Peace of Westphalia, Münster also has a very rich cultural life.

== Rankings ==
University rankings

Overall – Global & National
QS World 2024	384	21
THE World 2024	=193	19–21
ARWU World 2023	201–300	10–19

As per the QS World 2024 edition, the university was ranked 384th globally and 21st nationally. In the THE World 2023 rankings, the institution placed 193rd on a global scale and between 19th and 21st within its home country. The university was also evaluated in the ARWU World 2023, where it fell within the 201–300 range worldwide and within the top 10–19 nationally.

The University of Münster is member of the association German U15 e.V. which is a coalition of fifteen major research-intensive and leading medical universities in Germany with a full disciplinary spectrum, excluding any defining engineering sciences.

The Leiden university ranking, ranks Münster as the third best German university in the size-independent ranking. Strong faculties include mathematics, chemistry, medicine and business studies. According to the Shanghai university ranking, the University of Münster is the fourth best German university for chemistry (46th best university for chemistry worldwide).

Two Max-Planck-Prize and five Gottfried-Wilhelm-Leibniz-Winner are currently professors at the faculty of mathematics.

Münster has been successful with three excellence clusters "Cells in Motion" (discontinued), "Religion and Politics" and "Mathematics Münster: Dynamics – Geometry – Structure" in the German excellence initiative.

== Notable alumni ==
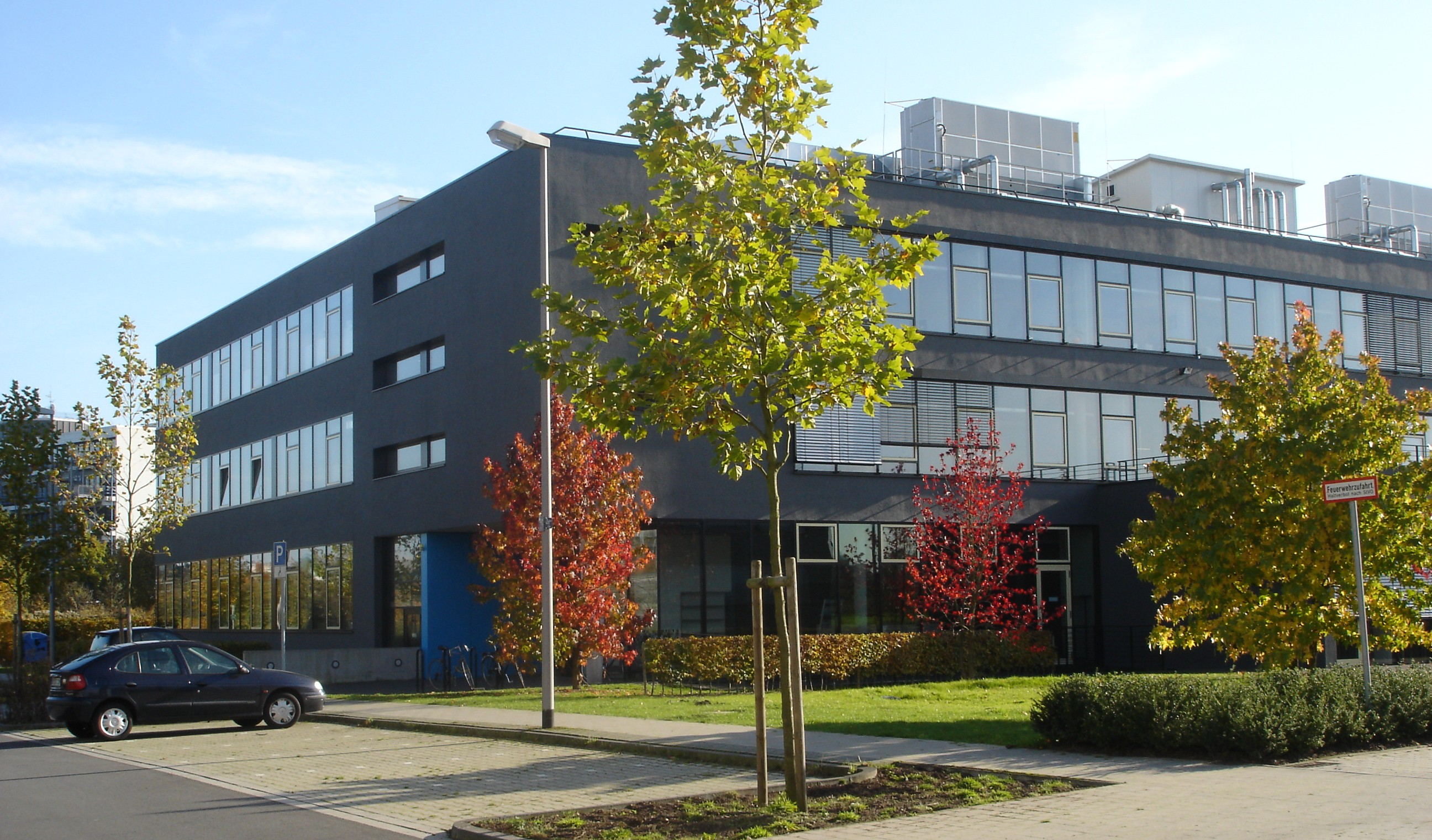
The Centre for Nanotechnology (CenTech)

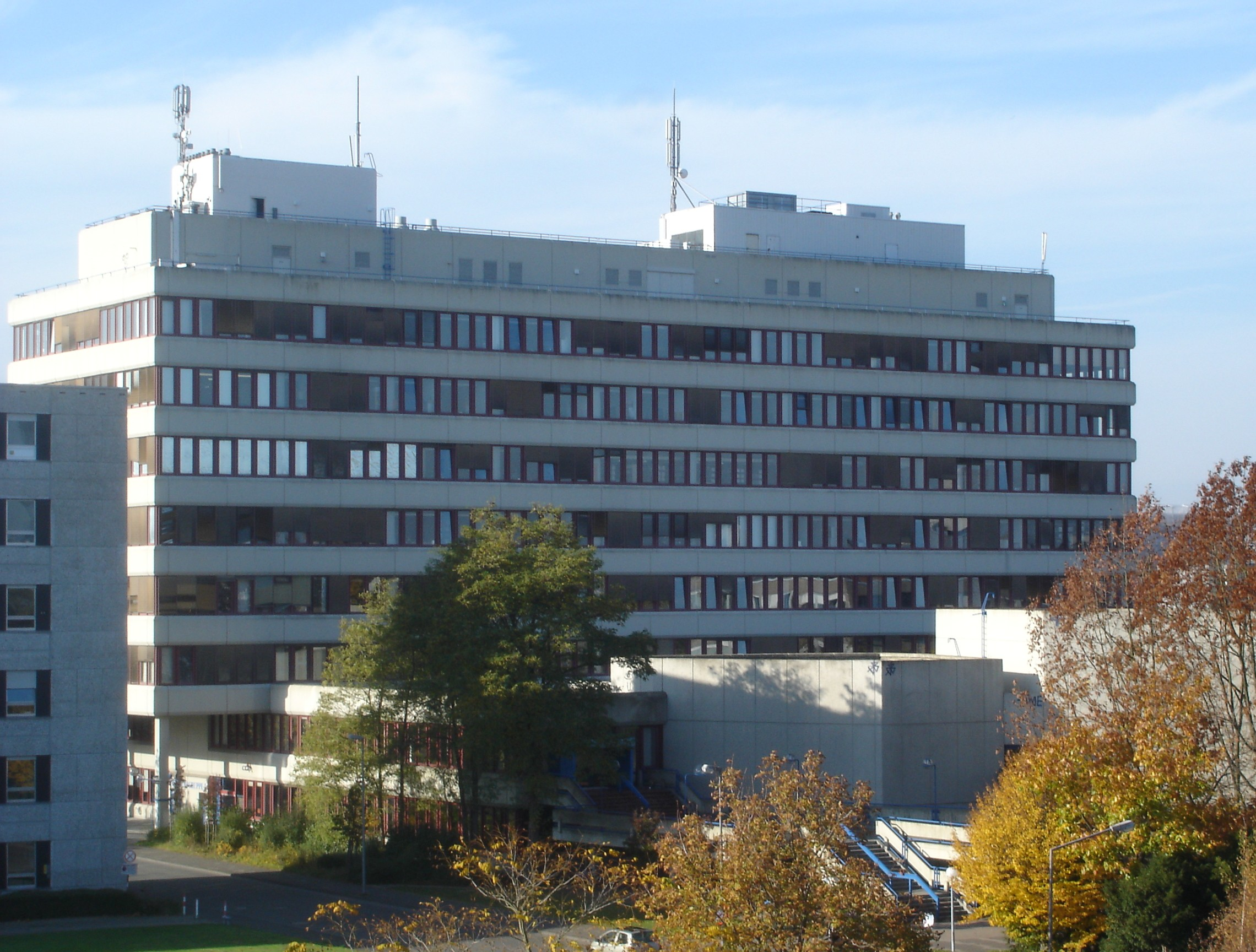
The department of physics

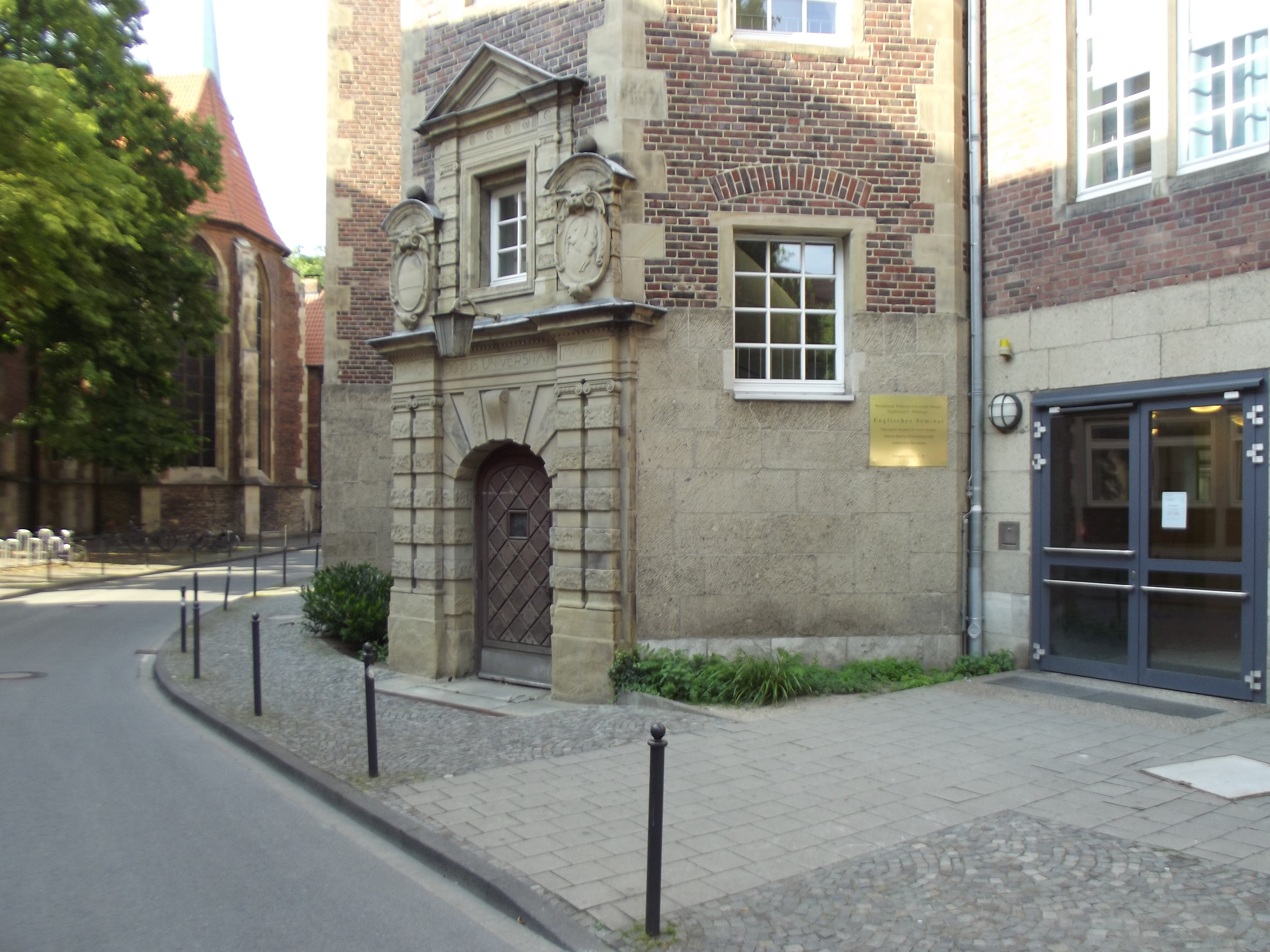
Entrance English Seminar

== See also ==
- Education in Germany
- List of early modern universities in Europe
- Muenster School of Business Administration and Economics
- Musikhochschule Münster
- CeNTech – Center for Nanotechnology
- European Research Center for Information Systems (ERCIS)
- Max Planck Institute for Molecular Biomedicine
- Uni Baskets Münster
