= Yu-Chen Wang =

British-Taiwanese artist

Yu-Chen Wang (born 1978 in Taichung Taiwan) is a British-Taiwanese artist and curator. She is based in London, UK, working internationally. Her practice explores the impact of industries and navigation on nature, landscape and people in Northern England. She is an Associate Lecturer at Camberwell College.

== Education ==
Yu-Chen Wang graduated with an MA in Fine Art from Chelsea College of Art in London in 2002. She previously attended the Postgraduate Study programme at Goldsmiths College University of London.

== Art Practice ==
Wang has worked with the impact of industries and navigation on nature, landscape and people in Northern England. Most recently, she extended her research onto Taiwan’s mangrove forests. She states that her practice "very much focuses on research and process, experience and relationship. There’s a particular way for developing my work, which often involves a period of time spent in a specific place. I would then undertake extensive research the contextual histories and engage with a group of locally-based people or specialists who would assist my research. Two major components I’d like to explore generally: the archives and archaeology, which form the main source of inspiration for developing my work."

In 2011, Wang created a multimedia project at the Victoria Baths as a result of her residency at the Centre for Chinese Contemporary Art in Manchester. The Splash and a Last Drop, based on a short science fiction story by Bob Dickinson, included a series of drawings, sculptures, and a film about an immersive live performance.

Her project Full Circle, an immersive cinematic video installation with sound design by Kristian Craig Robinson aka Capitol K, was commissioned by Doncaster Creates. Wang explored Doncaster’s industrial heritage and looked once again at the collision of nature and technology. The video was subsequently touring with screenings at The Lindholme Hall Estate in the Hatfield Moors and the Potteric Carr Nature Reserve as part of ArtBomb 2022. During her artist- residency at Metal, Peterborough in 2022, Wang researched the history of draining the Fens with a particular interest in the interaction between historic and natural environments.

Wang is interested in what is outside the picture, thereby excluded from history. The Honorary Mention Collide Award, a partnership programme between Arts at CERN and FACT Liverpool enabled Wang to be invited to Geneva in 2018 and establish a dialogue with engineers and particle physicists at CERN. Combining images and references from both personal and institutional archives with interviews with scientists she created the poetic narrative We aren't able to prove that just yet, but we know it's out there. By giving a voice to CERN’s technicians, analysts and engineers, she explored the human scale of the CERN project. Wang's interest in quantum physics continued in her participation in the festival In the Ether – A Festival of Quantum Science and Technology at the ArtScience Museum in Singapore. She was talking at the Quantum Conversations — It’s Here, There and Everywhere in 2025, on a panel with Dagomir Kaszlikowski, Principal Investigator at the Centre for Quantum Technologies, and Eckhard Wallis, curator at Deutsches Museum.

Her work How We Are Where We Are at Tate Modern in 2024 was looking at how collecting and displaying art are intertwined with industry and empire. Using the visual tropes used by museums founded in nineteenth-century Britain, Wang created a theatrical installation visitors could walk through. Her project was conceived during the Transforming Collections Artist Research Residency, as part of the Transforming Collections: Reimagining Art, Nation and Heritage project, led by Dr. susan pui san lok, director of the UAL Decolonising Arts Institute.

Along her exhibitions, the artist sometimes hosts dinner or breakfast events, like the cross-cultural Pān-toh Supra at Contemporary Art Space in Batumi and at Tbilisi Triennial in Georgia, two of many collaborations with her partner, the British-Georgian artist Andro Semeiko.

== Curatorial Practice ==
In her role as a curator, Wang was running the art space Basement Art Project in central London for many years. She curated Happy End at Yinka Shonibare's space Guest Projects in London featuring works by artists Andro Semeiko, Alasdair Duncan, Pil and Galia Kollectiv, Ad de Jong, Sheena Macrae, Andrew Darke, Lakis and Aris Ionas, Sebastian Lowsley-Williams and Tomoko Takahashi, including performances by Tom Eykelhof and Lesley Cook and a film programme curated by Georgia Korossi.

== Teaching ==
Yu-Chen Wang is Associate Lecturer in BA Fine Art Drawing at Camberwell College / University of the Arts London.

She has given lectures and talks at Goldsmiths, University of London; Falmouth University, Cornwall; Liverpool John Moores University; National Taipei University of Education; University for the Creative Arts, Canterbury; National Cheng Kung University, Tainan; Wimbledon College of Arts London; Lasalle College of the Arts in Singapore, among others.

== Awards and residencies ==
- 2011: Breathe residency at Chinese Centre for Contemporary Art Manchester
- 2016/17: Annotations Outset Study Commissions
- 2018: CERN Honorary Mention Collide International / New Art Commission
- 2018: Junction Works residency at Grand Union
- 2022: Residency at Metal, Peterborough, Chauffeur's Cottage
- 2023: Transforming Collections Artist Research Residency

== Exhibitions & Projects ==
- 2011: The Splash and A Last Drop, performance, FutureEverything at Victoria Baths, Manchester
- 2011: Cornerhouse, Manchester
- 2012: Hayward Gallery, London
- 2014: Taipei Biennial
- 2014: Yu-Chen Wang & Nicholas Vaughan, Hundred Years Gallery London
- 2014: This is the end..., Taipei Biennial (curated by Nicolas Bourriaud), Taipei City
- 2016: Nostalgia for the Future: An Introspective Retrospective, Taipei Fine Arts Museum
- 2016: Nostalgia for the Future: An Introspective Retrospective, Chinese Centre for Contemporary Art Manchester
- 2016: The Imitation Game, Manchester Art Gallery
- 2017: Pān-toh Supra, Contemporary Art Space, Batumi Georgia
- 2017: Drawing Biennial 2017, Drawing Room, London
- 2017: The New Observatory, FACT Liverpool
- 2018: Broken Symmetries, FACT Liverpool
- 2018: A History of Drawing, Camberwell Space London
- 2019: Science Gallery London
- 2019: Drawing Biennial 2019, Drawing Room, London
- 2019: Invisible: There’s more to it than meets the eye, Science Gallery Dublin
- 2020: National Taiwan Museum of Fine Arts
- 2020/21: If there is a place I haven't been to, Liquid Love, MOCA Taipei/TheCube Project Space, Taipei
- 2020/21: Broken Symmetries, Kumu Art Museum, Tallinn, with Julieta Aranda, Diann Baur, James Bridle, Mariele Neudecker, Suzanne Treister, Yu-Chen Wang and others.
- 2021: Drawing Biennial 2021, Drawing Room, London
- 2021: My Kid Could’ve Done That!, Edge Art Centre, University of Bath, curated by Will Cooper and his daughter, with artists Ryan Gander, Jasleen Kaur, Tessa Lynch, Laure Prouvost, Emily Speed, Yu-Chen Wang & Andro Semeiko, and their kids
- 2022: Yu-Chen Wang: Full Circle, Danum Gallery, Doncaster, curated by Mike Stubbs
- 2022: L’Œil du Cyclone, Le Lieu Unique, Nantes, with Yuan Goang-Ming, Chang Li-Ren, Huang Hai-Hsin, Yao Jui-Chung, Yu-Chen Wang, Su Hui-Yu and Wang Lien-Cheng, curated by Iris Shu Ping Huang, Patrick Gyger and Eli Commins.
- 2024: How We Are Where We Are, Tate Modern London

== Publications ==
- The Song of the Machines, Yu-Chen Wang, Jennifer Thatcher, with texts by Sophia Crilly, Bob Dickinson, Rudyard Kipling, Georgia Korossi, Nicolas de Oliveira/Nicola Oxley, Chelsea Pettitt, Centre For Chinese Contemporary Art Manchester, 2012. ISBN 0954544080, ISBN 9780954544089. OCLC 828716905
- Return from Voluntary Exile: Yu-Chen Wang Talks to White Fungus, Taipei Fine Arts Museum; National Culture and Arts Foundation, 2016.
- The Imitation Game, exhibition catalogue (with artists Ed Atkins, James Capper, Paul Granjon, Tove Kjellmark, Lynn Hershman Leeson, David Link, Mari Velonaki and Yu-Chen Wang, and authors Steve Furber, Clare Gannaway, Jackie Stacey, Lucy Suchman), Manchester Art Gallery, 2016. ISBN 9780901673930
- New Life and the Dream Garden, with essay by JJ Charlesworth, Leeds, Basement Arts Project, 2017
- Quantum - In search of the invisible, CCCB and Direcció de Comunicació de la Diputació de Barcelona, 2019. ISBN 978-84-9803-883-5, 978-84-9803-884-2, 978-84-9803-885-9, (català, castellano, English) OCLC 1159829134
- Emotionarama, Andrew Hunt and Andro Semeiko (eds.), with contributions by Polly Apfelbaum, Fiona Bannerer, Kerstin Brätsch, Liu Ding, Andy Holden, Mike Nelson, Alicia Paz, Lindsay Seers, Amy Sillman, Mark Titchner, Tris Vonna-Michell, Yu-Chen Wang, and many more, Slimvolume, 2020. ISBN 9781910516126. OCLC 1158719748
- Drawing Biennial 2021, catalogue, Drawing Room Publications, London 2021
