= Social Study of Information Systems =

The Social Study of Information Systems (SSIS) is interested in people developing and using technology and the "culture" of those people. SSIS brings social sciences concepts and methods to study information systems. SSIS studies these phenomena by drawing on and using "lenses" provided by social sciences, including philosophy, sociology, social psychology, organisational theory, political science. Thus, it relates to Social Informatics, Human-centered computing (HCC), Science and Technology Studies (STS), Design science.

== Key universities ==
Key Universities involved in SSIS are: the London School of Economics (LSE), Lancaster University, University of Manchester, University of Warwick, the Massachusetts Institute of Technology (MIT), University of Salford, Case Western Reserve University, the University of Cambridge, University of Edinburgh, Harvard University, and Peking University.

== Selected scholars ==
High-profile people in the field are Claudio Ciborra, Jannis Kallinikos, Chrisanthi Avgerou & Susan Scott (LSE), Wanda Orlikowski (MIT), Shoshana Zuboff (Harvard), Lucas Introna & Lucy Suchman (Lancaster), Joe Nandhakumar (Warwick), Wendy Currie (Greenwich), Geoff Walsham, Mathew Jones & Michael Barrett (Cambridge), Kalle Lyytinen (Case Western), Rob Kling (Indiana).

=== Additional scholars ===
The social study of information systems has also been shaped by the work of scholars across information systems, STS, sociology, communication, and public administration, including (alphabetical by surname):

- Rafael Alcadipani (FGV EAESP)
- Yochai Benkler (Harvard)
- Luciana D’Adderio (University of Edinburgh)
- Paul N. Edwards (Stanford)
- Bent Flyvbjerg (Oxford; megaprojects, governance)
- Elisa Giaccardi (TU Delft)
- Francis Harvey (Leibniz Institute for Regional Geography)
- Vincent Homburg (Erasmus Univ.; e‑government)
- Marina Jirotka (Oxford; human‑centred computing, RRI)
- John Leslie King (Michigan; IS & public policy)
- Rob Kitchin (Maynooth; geodata infrastructures)
- Karin Knorr Cetina (U. Chicago; epistemic cultures)
- Jean‑Fabrice Lebraty (Lyon business school; IS management)
- Nanette S. Levinson (American University; internet governance)
- Jonathan Lusthaus (Oxford; cybercrime sociology)
- Shirin Madon (LSE; ICT4D)
- Attila Márton (CBS; digital work & organizing)
- Gianluca Miscione (UCD; Information infrastructures and organizations)
- Gianluca Misuraca (digital governance)
- Vincent Mosco (critical communication studies)
- Victoria Nash (OII; internet policy)
- Annalisa Pelizza (University of Bologna; data infrastructures & governance)
- Neil Pollock (Edinburgh; information infrastructures, market devices)
- Georg Reischauer (WU Vienna; platforms & digitalization)
- Kai Riemer (University of Sydney; IT & organization)
- Richard Rottenburg (Halle/WiSER; anthropology of STS)
- Minna Ruckenstein (University of Helsinki; datafication)
- Saskia Sassen (Columbia; globalization, cities & digital change)
- Carsten Sørensen (LSE; digital innovation)
- Jason Bennett Thatcher (Temple)
- Christopher L. Tucci (Imperial; digital strategy & innovation)
- Georg von Krogh (ETH Zurich; knowledge & innovation)
- Helena Webb (Nottingham; responsible/ethical AI, HCI)
- Philip Kraft (Binghamton)
- Leiser Silva (University of Houston; power & politics in IS)
- Robin Williams (Edinburgh; social shaping of technology, IS)

== Key publications ==
- Quast, M., Handel, M. J., Favre, J.-M., Estublier, J. (2013) Social Information Systems : Agility Without Chaos, Enterprise Information Systems, Springer.
- Walsham, G. (1993) Interpreting information systems in organizations, John Wiley, Chichester.
- Zuboff, S. (1988) In the age of the smart machine: The future of work and power, Heinemann Professional, Oxford.

== See also ==
- Formative context
