= Ingar Roggen =

Spanish academic (1934–2023)

- Born: 26 April 1934; Valencia, Spain
- Died: 19 October 2023 (aged 89)
- Known for: Social informatics
- Scientific career
- Institutions: University of Oslo
- Thesis: Bidrag til tidssosiologien (1970)
- Doctoral advisor: Dag Østerberg and Sverre Lysgaard

Dich Ingar Emil Roggen (26 April 1934 – 19 October 2023) was a Norwegian sociologist, and has been described as one of the European social informatics pioneers. His field of work is focused on the social aspects of virtual space, the social analysis of the Internet, the interaction between man and computer, and with the implications of the information technology usage communication in all fields of society. In 1996 he introduced the Sociology of the World Wide Web (web sociology) as a web science, based on the principles of social informatics.

Roggen earned the PhD (mag.art.) degree in sociology in 1970 with a dissertation on social time, where he developed a theory of Relative Social Time with tense logic as method. In 1974 he was appointed assistant professor in sociology at the University of Oslo, where he was employed until his retirement in 2004. Through a series of studies of health risk factors in Norwegian industries and social services in 1970-1990 he developed a system for detection, prediction and prevention of supermortality in workplaces.

From a global historical viewpoint Stein Bråten must be considered as the founder of the science of social informatics, which he originally called "socioinformatics" (Norwegian: sosioinformatikk). He defined it as the common field of psychology, sociology and informatics. (Stein Bråten: Dialogens vilkår i datasamfunnet. Universitetsforlaget 1983.) At the Department of Sociology, University of Oslo (UiO) Stein Bråten inspired a group of pioneers in this field, including Eivind Jahren, Arild Jansen and Ingar Roggen. When web sociology was introduced in 1996, the first World Wide Web Virtual Laboratoratory (known as Weblab at UiO) was established at the Department of Sociology, directed by Ingar Roggen in collaboration with Knut A. G. Hauge and Trond Enger. The Department offered degrees up to the master (Norwegian: Cand.Polit.) level in these fields until 2000. While Kristen Nygaard's Simula was the programming language shared by the early socioinformaticians, the web sociologists gathered around Bill Atkinson's HyperCard with the programming language HyperTalk, the forerunner of the WWW-languages. The late Rob Kling, who had been given a personal introduction by Stein Bråten to the ongoing research on social informatics at the University of Oslo in 1986, and also had noted the introduction of web sociology in January 1996, established the American branch of social informatics at Indiana University later that year.

Roggen died on 19 October 2023, at the age of 89.
