= Alicia Paz =

Mexican-born British artist

Alicia Paz (*1967 in Mexico City) is an artist based in London, working internationally.

== Education ==
Paz was raised in Mexico. She graduated from UC Berkeley in California in 1989, then continued her studies at the École nationale supérieure des Beaux-Arts ENSBA in Paris and Goldsmiths College in London. In 2008, Paz graduated with an MA Painting from the Royal College of Art London.

== Practice ==
Over several years, Alicia Paz has focused on the tension between artifice/ illusion and the veracity of actual processes involved in painting, exposing the duplicitous nature of representation. Through her work, she explores notions of hybridity, assemblage, and metamorphosis, focusing particularly on the female figure: the self is experienced and presented as multiple, fluid, paradoxical. Paz's paintings are as much portraits as they are landscapes, combining references that range from erudite painting or the history of the painted image, to citations of advertising images or comics. Inhabiting fantastical and exotic landscapes, Paz's feminine subjects become fused and combined with organic life. Strange and unsettling visions of tree-women and monster-women also represent the fusion of the subject with painting itself: she often depicts amphibian or plant-like figures “weeping” pigment, their limbs, hair, and various ornamental accoutrements mud-caked and dripping, as if extracted from a colourful, post-cognitive swamp.

In August 2017 Paz unveiled her first public sculpture commission at Kunstmuseum Kloster Unser Lieben Frauen in Magdeburg, titled Insel der Puppen (Island of Dolls), in steel and enamel.

Paz is working on a large research and production project exploring the network of women that are playing an important role in her life, personally and professionally. Her project is supported by the Arts Council England. She developed her research it into three exhibition, each specifically adapted to the location and with new work for each show. The first installation was Río y Mar (River and Sea) at the Beecroft Art Gallery in Southend-on-Sea, part of Estuary 2021, followed by River Makers at the Visual Arts Centre in North Lincolnshire, both in 2021, and finally Juntas (Together) at the Maison de l'Amérique latine in Paris in early 2022. In 2024, the curator Bénédicte Delay, presented a solo show of Paz' work under the title Explorations au féminin at the Château de Haroué in Eastern France, in collaboration with the Centre des monuments nationaux CMN.

Her solo show Odisea opened during the Semana de las Artes Monterrey at the Drexel Gallery in Mexico in January 2026. She presented works that "explore water and ceramic traditions (…) from a hybrid and feminist perspective."

== Selected works ==
- Island of Dolls (Insel der Puppen), 2017, large exterior sculpture in email, steel and concrete, a commission for the Kunstmuseum Kloster Unser Lieben Frauen in Magdeburg
- L'effrontée, 2011, mixed media on paper, 74 × 56 cm
- Trapèze, 2010, oil, acrylic, collage on canvas 200 × 160 cm (FRAC Languedoc-Roussillon collection)
- When the Machine Stops, 2006, oil, acrylic, collage on canvas, 130 × 97 cm (Colección Costantini, MALBA Museum, Buenos Aires, Argentina)
- Ghosts, oil, acrylic on canvas, 200 × 160 cm, 1999 (FRAC Île-de-France collection)
- Colossus, 1995, acrylic on canvas, 150 × 120 cm (FMAC Paris collection)

== Exhibitions ==
=== Solo exhibitions (selection) ===
- 2026: Drexel Galería, San Pedro Garza García, Odisea
- 2024: Château de Haroué, Alicia Paz - Explorations au féminin
- 2022: Maison de l'Amérique latine, Paris, Juntas
- 2021: Visual Arts Centre, Scunthorpe, River Makers
- 2021: Beecroft Art Gallery, Southend-on-Sea, Río y Mar (River and Sea)
- 2010: LAC Narbonne, in association with FRAC Languedoc-Rousillon for Casanova Forever, Sigean France
- 2007: Unit 2 Gallery, London Metropolitan University, London UK
- 2006: Houldsworth Gallery, London, UK
- 2005: Ruth Benzacar Gallery, Buenos Aires, Argentina
- 2000: Galerie Yvonamor Palix, Paris, France

=== Group exhibitions (selection) ===
- 2021: Beecroft Art Gallery, Southend UK, Río y Mar (River and Sea), as part of Estuary 2021
- 2012: Through the Looking Glass, The Agency Gallery, London, UK
- 2011: Round and Round and Round (Part 2), exhibition drawn from the FRAC IDF Collection, curated by Xavier Franceschi, Parc culturel de Rentilly, France
- 2009: Multiverse, curated by Ole Hagen, Danielle Arnaud Gallery, London, UK
- 2008: Jerwood Contemporary Painters, Jerwood Space, London, UK
- 2007: Celeste Art Prize, selected by Goldsmiths College Curating MA, London, UK
- 2007: Incheon Biennale, Incheon, South Korea
- 2006: John Moores 24, selectors: Peter Blake, Tracey Emin, Walker Art Gallery, Liverpool Biennial, UK
- 2004: EAST International, selectors: Neo Rauch, Gerd Harry Lybke, Norwich, UK
- 2004: Mind the Gap, 10 London Artists, sponsored by British Council, Triangle, Marseille, France
- 1999: ZAC 99, collaboration directed by "Bureau d'Etudes" and Jota Castro, Musée d'Art Moderne de la Ville de Paris, France
- 1998:Tamayo Museum Biennale, Oaxaca, Mexico

== Awards, grants and residencies ==
- 2023: S1 | Chatsworth Residency (S1 Artspace, Chatsworth House Trust, Centre for Print Research at the University of West England)
- 2022: Cité internationale des arts, Paris
- 2022: residency at the Leonora Carrington Museum, Mexico
- 2002: Triangle France, Artist's Residency, La Friche de la Belle de Mai, Marseilles, France
- 2002: Cité internationale des arts, Artist's Residency in Paris
- 2001: Gasworks Artist's Residency, London, UK
- 2001: Grant awarded by Fondo Nacional para la Cultura y las Artes, Mexico
- 1999: Delfina Studio Trust Residency, London, UK

== Collections ==
- Musée d'Art Moderne de Céret, France
- Hanlim Museum, Daejeon, Korea
- FMAC City of Paris, France
- Le Plateau
- FRAC Languedoc-Roussillon
- Colección Costantini, MALBA, Buenos Aires, Argentina
- APT, Mexico City
- Government Art Collection

== Further links ==
- Alicia Paz, Website of the artist
- Uwe Gellner, Annegret Laabs, Jeannette Louie. Alicia Paz - The Garden of Follies. Verlag für Moderne Kunst, Vienna, 2016. ISBN 9783903004917
- Deyries-Henry, Dorothée (2008). Permutations, 40 Artistes 01 musée vide. Musée de Valence.
- Charlesworth, JJ (May 2007). "Alicia Paz". Time Out London.
- Malherbe, Anne (December 2006). "Je revais d'un autre Monde". art press.
- Lamy, Frank (August 2002). "Peinture, La Galaxie Française". Gazette des Beaux-Arts. No. 219.
- Piguet, Phillipe (May 2000). "Alicia Paz". L'ŒIL.
- Lamy, Frank (May 2000). "Alicia Paz". Tribeca Magazine.
