= Monica Bello (art historian) =

Spanish curator and art historian

Mónica Bello
- Scientific career
- Fields: Art curator and art historian
- Workplaces: CERN Fundació Gala-Salvador Dalí

Mónica Bello is an art historian and curator based in Barcelona. She is director of Platform Dalí, a programme of Fundació Gala-Salvador Dalí.

Until March 2025, she served as Head of Arts at CERN, the European Organization for Nuclear Research in Geneva. In this influential role, she provided strategic leadership and direction for the laboratory's art programs, overseeing the conception and implementation of initiatives such as artist residencies, art commissions, and exhibitions.

During her ten years tenure, Bello supported over 200 artists at CERN, fostering their engagement with science and promoting collaboration and dialogue with physicists, engineers, and staff. Under her guidance, the Arts at CERN team was awarded the prestigious STARTS Grand Prize for Innovative Collaboration in 2024.

In 2025 she curated the exhibition Quantum Visions, where several creators are invited to explore the developments in quantum physics from an artistic lens, at Tabakalera in Donostia/San Sebastián. Other notable curatorial projects include the Icelandic Pavilion at the 59th Venice Biennale featuring artist Sigurður Guðjónsson (2022); Dark Matters at Science Gallery Melbourne (2023); and Broken Symmetries (2018–2021), a touring exhibition presented at six leading art institutions across Europe and Asia. She was also the guest curator for the prestigious Audemars Piguet Art Commission at Art Basel in 2018.

From 2010 to 2015, Bello was the Artistic Director of VIDA, the Art and Artificial Life Awards at Fundación Telefónica in Madrid. Before that, she led the Department of Education at Laboral Centro de Arte in Gijón (2008–2010).

Early in her career, in 2003, she was recipient of the Emergent Curators Award Inéditos at Casa Encendida Madrid. In her award-winning exhibition, Organisms became one of the first exhibitions of bioart in Spain - with works as Meart The Semi-Living artist and Pig Wings by the Tissue Culture & Art Project.

== Recent curatorial projects ==
- Semiconductor, a solo exhibition of the artistic duo Semiconductor at Museo Nacional de Cerillos, Santiago de Chile, October–December 2019. As part of the 14th Bienal de Artes Mediales de Santiago.
- Quàntica, an exhibition on art and physics at CCCB, Barcelona. From April to September 2019. Co-curated with José-Carlos Mariátegui. The exhibition Quantum gives us the keys to understanding the principles of Quantum physics, and it does so through the joint creative work of scientists and artists. The project invites the public to browse freely, to awaken their curiosity, and to critically evaluate the new paradigms of modern science.
- Broken Symmetries, at FACT, Liverpool. November 2018–March 2019. A touring exhibition featuring ten art projects resulting from Arts at CERN's Collide International in collaboration with FACT, Liverpool. Touring to Barcelona, Brussels and Nantes as 'Quantica/ Quantum', from 2019-2021. Co-curated with José-Carlos Mariátegui. List of artists: Julieta Aranda, Dianne Bauer, James Bridle, Juan Cortés, Jack Jelfs and Haroon Mirza, Yunchul Kim, Lea Porsager, Semiconductor, Suzanne Treister, Yu-Chen Wang.
- HALO. Audemars Piguet Arts Commission, Art Basel, Basel. June 2018. Audemars Piguet Art Commission supports artists in the creation of works of exceptional complexity, precision, and experiential impact on an ongoing, annual basis. The newly commissioned art works, overseen by an annual guest curator and selected by an international advisory board, are presented to the public to coincide with Art Basel. British artist-duo Semiconductor, Ruth Jarman and Joe Gerhardt, have been selected to create HALO, an immersive installation using data from the ATLAS experiment at the Large Hadron Collider, in collaboration with CERN.
- Llull- Kurokawa In the Light of Ideas, Centre d'Art Santa Mònica, Barcelona. October 2017. Co-curated with Andy Gracie. Artist: Ryoichi Kurokawa. Exhibition design: Olga Subirós. A contemporary outlook on the figure of Ramon Llull, mystic and visionary, and the parallels between his work and modern science 700 years after his death. In his intense inquiry into the laws of nature and the world, Llull combines mysticism, logic and science. And while he expresses himself within the insufficiency of the conventional Christian system, he draws on the confluence of all the knowledge of his time.
- Dark Matter, The Invisible Around Us, 5th Touch Me Festival, Zagreb. October 2017. Co-curated with KONTEJNER. The exhibition refers to the hidden events and phenomena that cannot reach us at any degree of perceptual significance and how artists define, design and build up creative modes for exploration and interaction within the hidden events that lie within the core of nature. Artists: Filip Borelli, Alfonso Borragán, Ivan Curić, Kerstin Ergenzinger, Martin Howse, Yunchul Kim, Vanessa Lorenzo, Ale de la Puente, Semiconductor, Ana Sladetić & Nika Jurlin, Martina Zelenika MOON.
- Vanishing Points. Centro Nacional de las Artes, Ciudad de México, September–November 2015. As part of Transitio06. Artists: Boredom Research, Paolo Cirio, Joan Leandre, Lisa Ma, Jason Rohrer, Karolina Sobecka. The exhibition examined the rise of a collective consciousness of the world and how it is determined by the digital technologies.
- VIDA Awards Annual Exhibitions. ARCO Art Fair. Fundación Telefónica stand. 2010-2014

== Articles, publications ==
- Bello Bugallo, M. and Gracie, A., (2020). Black Holes and Objectivity. Artnodes, (25). doi:10.7238/a.v0i25.3332
- Bello M. (2019) Field Experiences: Fundamental Science and Research in the Arts. In: Wuppuluri S., Wu D. (eds) On Art and Science. The Frontiers Collection. Springer, Cham. doi:10.1007/978-3-030-27577-8_13
- Bello, M., & Mariátegui, J.-C. (2019). QUANTUM: In search of the invisible. Barcelona: Centre de Cultura Contemporània de Barcelona CCCB Press and Communication Office of the Barcelona Provincial Council. ISBN 978-84-9803-885-9
