= Rybon Art Center =

Rybon Art Center was an international, independent, and artist-led institute founded in 2008 and based in Tehran, Iran. It closed in c. 2017.

== History ==
Rybon Art Center centered collectivity and evolved over the years, undertaking initiatives such as art residencies, local and international artist workshops, art shares, artist talks, screenings, strengthening local art networks, and facilitating international art exchanges. The center had a close partner, Rybon Doc, founded by Amir Hossein Sanaei, which focused on Iranian documentary cinema.

Rybon started its first residency projects in collaboration with local artistic and cultural institutes, inviting established artists from neighboring countries. Holding Rybon International Artists’ Workshop based on Triangle workshops in 2012 in collaboration with Mohsen Gallery and Darbast Platform in Tehran was another step toward establishing residency culture.

Impediments for holding international residencies lead to exchange programs. The first of these was held in 2013 in collaboration with Organhaus Art Space of China and Mohsen Gallery in Tehran and Chongqing, China. The “Exchange Program” became a pivotal part of Kooshk Residency programs.

Rybon organized the Second Rybon International Artists's Workshop in 2016 based on Triangle workshops in collaboration with Kooshk Residency, Deegar platform and Gasworks. This program aimed to gather artists from across the world to discuss and look to exchange ideas and knowledge beyond ethnic, regional and artistic boundaries. Five Asian, European and African artists, as well as five Iranian artists participated in this program.
