= Claudio Ciborra =

Italian academic

Claudio Ciborra (1951 – 13 February 2005) was an Italian organizational theorist, and Professor of Information Systems and PWC Chair in Risk Management in the London School of Economics. Prior to the LSE, he was professor at the Theseus International Management Institute.

== Work ==
Ciborra was an original thinker in his field: the Social Study of Information Systems. His contribution ranks among that of the top names in this and related fields such as Shoshana Zuboff, Wanda Orlikowski, Steve Barley, M. Lynne Markus, Lucas Introna, Jannis Kallinikos, Geoff Walsham, Rob Kling, Daniel Robey, Chrisanthi Avgerou and Richard Boland. He collaborated widely, including with such scholars as Ole Hanseth (University of Oslo) and Giovan Francesco Lanzara (University of Bologna).

Ciborra contributed to the following areas.

- The relationship between technology and organizations
- Transaction cost theory and IS
- Organizational learning, bricolage and improvisation
- IS infrastructures.

=== Improvisation ===
Ciborra goes beyond the typical characterisation of improvisation as situated, pragmatic and contingent action by referring to the existential condition of the actor (his “moods feelings, affectations and fundamental attunement with the situation”). By eschewing the notion of the actor as a “robot” adapting to changing circumstances he reintroduces the personal human aspects that shape our encounters with the world and shows how our affectations define the situation at hand and so shape action.

=== Bricolage ===
As expounded by Ciborra, bricolage can be seen as the constant re-ordering of people and resources, the constant "trying out" and experimentation that is the true hallmark of organisational change. But bricolage is not a random trying out: Ciborra emphasises that it is a trying out based on leveraging the world "as defined by the situation".

=== Hospitality (xenia) ===
Hospitality is Claudio's attempt to present an alternative conception of how IT/IS is implemented. He rejects the scientific explanations of IS implementation (planning, design, goals, targets, methods, procedures) and instead views technology as an alien embodying and exemplifying its alien culture and affordances. Successful implementation is achieved when the "host" organisation (i.e. that implementing the technology) is able to extend courtesy and to absorb and appropriate/assimilate the alien culture where it offers advantages such as new ways of working. Claudio also warns that the host must beware that the guest can quickly become hostile.

=== Crisis ===
Ciborra claims that much of the IS and IT world (particularly their strategic management, marketing, academia and training organisations) are in crisis. He teaches that this is because IS and IT are treated as scientific disciplines when in fact they are social disciplines and hence thinking about them is based in an inappropriate paradigm which we might call "Positivism" (although Ciborra does not use this term).

=== Formative context ===
Ciborra drew on the work of Roberto Unger and showed how IS can embody and so be enacted as Formative Context.

- Drift
- Caring
- The Platform Organisation

=== Gestell ===
Ciborra analyses Information System infrastructure using Heidegger's concept of Gestell.

For further information see Labyrinths of Information, OUP, 2002.
