= José-Carlos Mariátegui =

Peruvian scientist

- Education: Universidad Peruana Cayetano Heredia (B.Sc.); London School of Economics and Political Science (M.Sc., Ph.D.)
- Scientific career
- Fields: Organizational studies and technology; Media theory and history; Media art in Latin America; Cybernetics; Museums and technology
- Workplaces: University of the Pacific (Peru); London School of Economics and Political Science; Libera Università Internazionale degli Studi Sociali Guido Carli
- Thesis: Image, information and changing work practices: the case of the BBC’s Digital Media Initiative (2013)
- Doctoral advisor: Jannis Kallinikos

José-Carlos Mariátegui is a scientist, writer, curator and scholar on culture, new media and technology. He explores the intersection of culture and technology, history of cybernetics, media archeology, digitization, video archives, and the impact of technology on memory institutions. Born in 1975, he is the son of Peruvian psychiatrist Javier Mariategui and the grandson of Jose Carlos Mariategui, the most influential Latin American Marxist thinker of the 20th century. He studied Mathematics and Biology at Cayetano Heredia University in Lima, Perú and did both Masters and Doctoral degrees in Information Systems and Innovation from the London School of Economics and Political Science – LSE (London). His PhD, dated 2013, was titled "Image, information and changing work practices: the case of the BBC’s Digital Media Initiative" under the supervision of Prof. Jannis Kallinikos. He has been involved in teaching and research activities, and has published a variety of articles on art, science, technology, society and development. He founded Alta Tecnología Andina (ATA), non-profit organization dedicated to the development and research of artistic and scientific theories in Latin America. Founder of the International Festival of Video and Electronic Art in Lima (1998–2003). Founding Director of the José Carlos Mariátegui Museum, in Lima, Peru (1995–2005). He is currently an adjunct professor at LUISS (Rome), a senior visiting research fellow at the Department of Media and Communications at the LSE, a board member of Future Everything (UK), a member of the board of trustees (Kuratorium) of the ZKM Center for Art and Media Karlsruhe (Germany) and Editorial Board member for the Leonardo Book Series at MIT Press. He also chairs the Museo de Arte de Lima - MALI Education Committee.

For many years he worked with Gianni Toti and collaborated in Tupac Amauta, Toti's last series of works while being both residents at the CICV Centre de Recherche Pierre Schaeffer Montbéliard Belfort (France, 1997–2002). While studying in Lima, he worked with Prof. Alberto Cordero a coordinator of the Scientific Thought and Philosophy of Science Program, Cayetano Heredia University (Lima, 1995–2001). Was a member of the National Commission of Culture, a high-level dependency of the president that proposed the cultural and scientific policy in Peru (2001–2002) and the longer-serving board member of the National Advisory Commission of the Ministry of Culture in Peru (2010–2021).

Along with geneticist and art critic Jorge Villacorta started Escuelab, an advanced research center for research and innovation for Latin America. He was a member of the advisory council of Third Text (2007–2012). He was also a Network Committee member of the Prince Claus Fund (The Netherlands).

== Books ==
El pensamiento es un jardín hibrido. El archivo Mariotti - Luy (1964-2024). (with Miguel L. López) MALI - Museo de Arte de Lima, 2026.

El Incondicionado Desocultamiento. The Rafael Hastings Film Project (Editor & Author). Lima, ICPNA, Instituto Cultural Peruano Norteamericano, 2025

Museo digital. Inteligencias y artificios (Editor & Author). Mexico, Museo Universitario Arte Contemporáneo - MUAC, Universidad Nacional Autónoma de México - UNAM, 2025 (Open Access available).

ARTEÔNICA: Art, Science, and Technology in Latin American Today, Exhibition Catalog (with Urtiaga, G., Editor / J.-C. Mariátegui, Consultant Editor & Author). Long Beach, The Museum of Latin American Art (MOLAA), 2024.

Rasheed Araeen: Del cero al infinito escritos de arte y lucha, Metales Pesados, Santiago de Chile, 2019.

Quàntica/ Quantum / Cuántica (trilingual) (with Monica Bello) Centre de Cultura Contemporània de Barcelona CCCB, Press and Communication Office of the Barcelona Provincial Council, Barcelona, 2019.

The Future Was Now. 21 Years of Video Art and Electronic art in Peru (1995 – 2016) (bilingual) (with Jorge Villacorta and Max Hernández), Lima, 2018.

Emergentes. LABoral Centro de Arte y Creación Industrial, Gijón, 2008.

"Videografías In(visibles): una selección de videoarte latinoamericano 2000 - 2005," (a selection of video art from Latin-America with Jorge Villacorta) "Museo Patio Herreriano (and touring around Latin America), Alta Tecnología Andina, Valladolid, 2005. http://www.videografiasinvisibles.org/

"Via Satelite: Panorama de la Fotografía y el Video en el Perú Contemporáneo". Espacio Fundación Telefónica, 102 p. (with Miguel Zegarra).

== Selected articles ==
- “Global Spots: Perú”, Careers in Multimedia (ed. vivid studios) Ziff-Davis Press (ISBN 1-56276-311-3), California, 1995, pp. 66–75.
- “Techno-revolution: False evolution?”, Third Text, n. 47 (editor: Sean Cubitt), London, 1999, pp. 71–76.
- “Zur elektronischen Videokunst in Peru”, Fortbildungsseminar “Medienkunst” des Goethe-Insituts am Zentrum für Kunst und Medientechnologie ZKM, Karlsruhe, 2000, pp. 150–154.
- “The Camera as an Interface: Closed-Circuit Video Projects in Peru” Leonardo Electronic Almanac (ISSN 1071-4391), Vol. 10, num. 3, March 2002.
- “Peruvian Video/Electronic Art” En: Leonardo Gallery, Leonardo Journal, Vol. 35, No. 4, pp. 335–363, MIT Press, 2002.
- “Lebende und optische Maschinen – Eine Interpretation von zwei installationen” in “Rosa Barba: off sites”, Verlag del Buchlandlung Walther Köning, Köln, 2003.
- “Roger Atasi/Francesco Mariotti: deux génerations/une historie brève” En: “Turbulences vidéo”, revue trimestrielle # 39, France, April, 2003, pp. 18–21.
- “Creadores y Nuevas Tecnologias. Una breve historia del arte electrónico en America Latina” In: Cuaderno Central Arte Digital, Telos (Journal of Communications, technology and society), July–September 2003, No 56, Madrid, 2003.
- “Sobre o futuro da arte e da ciência através da inventividade humana” In: Arte e Vida no seculo XXI: tecnologia, ciência y creatividade” (org. Diana Dominguez), Editora UNESP, Sao Paulo, 2003, pp. 159–166 (ISBN 85-7139-489-X)
- “Video-Arte-Electrónico en Peru 2.0” In: “Perú/Video/Arte/Electrónico: memorias del festival internacional de video/arte/electronica” (ed. José-Carlos Mariátegui), Lima, 2004, pp. 10 – 25.
- “Lateinamerikanische Medienkunst: Lokale Produktion/Gobale Artikulation” In: “Bandbreite. Medien zwischen Kunst und Politik”, (eds. Andreas Broeckmann y Rudolf Frieling), Kulturverlag Kadmos, Berlin, 2004, pp. 113–120 (ISBN 3-931659-65-8)
- “Progress Revisited: Biology meets Humanity (Again)” In: Timeshift (eds. Gerfried Stocker y Christine Schöpf), Hatje Cantz, 2004, pp. 18–19 (ISBN 3-7757-1492-8).
- “Video art days. An intense decade of video art in Peru”, In ‘Latin-American Video Art: A Critical View’ (editor: L. Baigorri), Brumaria, Madrid, 2008.
- “Social Formations of Global Media Art” (con S. Cubitt, G. Nadarajan), Third Text, Volume 23, Issue 3 (MEDIA ARTS: Practice, Institutions and Histories), London, 2009.
- "Video as Digital Object: Production and Distribution of Video Content in the Internet Media Ecosystem." (with Jannis Kallinikos), The Information Society 27(5), 2011.
- “El aparato dialéctico: entre los soportes electrónicos y la expansión eletrónica del arte”. En: Jiménez, José, (ed.) Una teoría del arte desde América Latina. Turner, Madrid, 2011.
- “Disruptive, Expandable and Planetarian:Technology in Arts and Culture in Latin America”. Amsterdam, Prince Claus Fund, 2012.
- “Art and Artificial Life in Latin America: from historical legacy to contemporary influence” In: Arte y Vida Artificial: VIDA 1999-2012. K. Ohlenschläger. Madrid, Fundación Telefónica, 2012.
- “De Vestigios Tecnológicos a Objetos Digitales: una aproximación a la obra de Daniel Canogar a partir de la serie “Quadratura”. Daniel Canogar "Quadratura". Fundación Telefónica. Lima, 2014.
- "De/contextualizing Information: The Digitization of Video Editing Practices at the BBC." (with A. Marton) The information Society, special issue "Regimes of Information and the Paradox of Embeddedness" 31(2): 106-120, 2015.
- "Constructing a Socioplanetary Fabric: Fragmented Images and the (Re)constitution of Materiality in the Work of Elena Damiani." In: Elena Damiani: Sediments: An Assemblage of Remains, edited by Ekaterina Álvarez Romero, 58-63. Mexico, DF: MUAC • Museo Universitario Arte Contemporáneo, UNAM, 2015.
- “In search for transdisciplinary models of creation in Latin America. The Case of Escuelab”. NMC Media-N | Journal of the New Media Caucus 12 (1). Primavera 2016.
- Hacia una ontología del video. Ansible(4), 41-53, 2017.
- Mariátegui, emprendedor y formador de redes socio-culturales. En: D. Amaya & M. Delgado (Eds.), La página blanca entre el signo y el latido: La edición del libro literario (1920–1970) (pp. 30–35). Lima: Casa de la Literatura Peruana, 2017.
- “Recreando artefactos digitales: del archivo de ATA a la curaduría de metadATA” (with N. Montes). ILLAPA Revista del Instituto de Investigaciones Museológicas y Artísticas de la Universidad Ricardo Palma, 14, 130-141, 2017.
- “Art is Social: A Path to the New Technological Culture in Latin America." In: Latin American Modernisms and Technology, edited by María Fernández, 2019.
- “Double-bind Information Systems in the Work of Teresa Burga". In O. Grau & I. Hinterwaldner (Eds.), Retracing Political Dimensions: Strategies in Contemporary New Media Art. De Gruyter, 2020.
- José Carlos Mariátegui: entre las políticas culturales y la gestión cultural. Letras (Lima), 94(139), 61-77, 2023 (with Víctor Vich), 2020.
- Porous and Poietic Exchanges: Pioneering Practices in the Arts, Sciences, Technologies in South America. Journal of History and Philosophy of Art, 2, 76-105, 2021.
- Cybernetics and Systems Art in Latin America. The Art and Communication Center (CAyC) and its pioneering art and technology network. AI & Soc., 37(3), 1071–1084, 2022.
- Cybernetics and the Arts in Latin America – A Journey. VCS-Visual Cultural Studies Journal / Rivista semestrale di cultura visuale(3-4 (special double issue), 77-98, 2022.
- Imagined Video Archives: Strategies and Conditions of Video Art Collections in Latin America. In G. Phillips & E. Shtromberg (Eds.), Encounters in Video Art in Latin America (pp. 91–109). Getty Publications / The Getty Research Institute, 2023.
- Centro: un caso de socialismo cibernético en el Perú. In J. García Liendo & M. Mitrovic (Eds.), Intelectuales, política y producción cultural en el Perú de los 70 (pp. 117–145). Lima: Universidad Nacional Mayor de San Marcos, Fondo Editorial, 2024.

== Edited Journals ==
- Guest Editor (with S. Cubitt & G. Nadarajan) Special issue on "MEDIA ARTS: Practice, Institutions and Histories", Third Text, 23, 2009.
- Guest Editor (with I. Nieto & D. Maulen) Special issue on “Cybernetics in Latin America: Contexts Developments, Perceptions and Impacts”, AI & Society, 37, 2022.

== Selected curatorial projects ==
- Nueva/Vista: Videokunst aus Lateinamerika ifa-Galerie Bonn, Berlin, Stuttgart, 2002 – 2003.
- World Wide Video Festival, Amsterdam, 8 – 25 of May, 2003.
- Via Satellite: Panorama de la Fotografía y el Video en el Perú Contemporáneo Centro Cultural de España en Lima, Montevideo, Buenos Aires, México y Santiago, 2004 – 2007.
- "Videografías In(visibles): a selection of video art from Latin-America 2000 – 2005" (with Jorge Villacorta) "Museo Patio Herreriano, Centro Atlántico de Arte Contemporáneo, España (and touring around Latin America), 2005-2009.
- "Emergentes: 10 projects from Latin-American artists / Works in process", LABoral Centro de Arte y Creación Industrial, Gijón, co-produced with Telefonica Foundation (and touring around Latin America), 2008.
- “Video XXI: LeMaitre Collection”, Fundación Telefónica and Museo de Arte de Lima (MALI), 2010.
- 9th Shanghai Biennale "Reactivation" / Inter-city Pavilions Project, Shanghai, 2012. Lima Pavilion “José Carlos Martinat: All the Republic in One (Stereoreality environment 12)”, (also exhibited at “City Centre: Diankou, Lima, Palermo”, organized by ArthubAsia and the Gervasuti Foundation, 55th Venice biennale, 2013).
- Zero to Infinity”, installation by Rasheed Araeen, Museo de Arte de Lima (MALI), Parques Zonales “Huáscar” (Villa El Salvador), “Huiracocha” (San Juan de Lurigancho) y “Cápac Yupanqui” (Rímac), Lima, 2013.
- “Performativity of Presence” y “Printed Cinema#14 - Subconscious Society) by Rosa Barba, Moving Image Biennale – BIM 2014, Universidad Nacional de Tres de Febrero, Buenos Aires, 2014.
- "POETRÓNICO: Gianni Toti y los orígenes de la video poesía", Museo de Arte Contemporáneo (MAC) and Casa de la Literatura, Lima, 2015-2016.
- "metadATA 20 años de cultura, arte y tecnología" (with Jorge Villacorta, Nataly Montes y Reina Jara), Centro Cultural Ricardo Palma, Lima, 2016.
- Spider by Marco Pando (with Elisa Arca), Moving Image Biennale – BIM 2016, Universidad Nacional de Tres de Febrero, Buenos Aires, 2016.
- Quàntica, an exhibition on art and physics at CCCB, Barcelona. From April to September, 2019. Co-curated with Monica Bello (art historian). The exhibition Quantum gives us the keys to understanding the principles of Quantum physics, and it does so through the joint creative work of scientists and artists. The project invites the public to browse freely, to awaken their curiosity, and to critically evaluate the new paradigms of modern science.
- *Broken Symmetries, at FACT, Liverpool. November 2018- March 2019. A touring exhibition featuring ten art projects resulting from Arts at CERN's Collide International in collaboration with FACT, Liverpool. Touring to Barcelona, Brussels, Taichung, Tallinn and Nantes as 'Quantica/ Quantum', from 2019 to 2021. Co-curated with Monica Bello (art historian). List of artists: Julieta Aranda, Dianne Bauer, James Bridle, Juan Cortés, Jack Jelfs and Haroon Mirza, Yunchul Kim, Lea Porsager, Semiconductor, Suzanne Treister, Yu-Chen Wang.
- VÍDEO TRANSLACIONES: MIRADAS X ESPACIOS 13 artistas peruanos, Perú país en ARCOmadrid". Centro Conde Duque, Madrid, Febrero, 2019.
- La Ley de la Ventaja Historias y alusiones al deporte y resistencia en el audiovisual peruano (with Jorge Villacorta), Culturaymi Programa Cultural de los Juegos Panamericanos Lima 2019, Museo Metropolitano de Lima, Parque de la Exposición, 2019.
- Dispositivo, Experimento, Participación: Exploraciones de la Imagen En Movimiento en el Perú, Ccori Wasi Cultural Center, Lima, 2022.
- Rosa Barba. Evoking a Space Beyond Cinema - MALI, Lima - February 16 to June 16, 2024.
- ARTEONICA*: Art, Science, and Technology in Latin America Today - MOLAA, Los Angeles - Sep 22, 2024 - Feb 2, 2025.
