= Jorge Villacorta =

Peruvian art critic and independent curator

Jorge Villacorta is a Peruvian art critic and independent curator, with a strong interest in contemporary visual arts. He is also the co-founder and academic director of Alta Tecnologia Andina.

== Biography ==
Villacorta has a strong interest in contemporary Peruvian visual arts research. Since 1997, he has been an Art and Communication professor for the Postgraduate program at the Pontificia Universidad Católica del Perú. Since 1999, he was the professor for the Artistic Interrelations Seminar at the Plastic Arts faculty (which is located at Pontificia Universidad Católica del Perú). From 1993 to 1998, he taught history of photography at the Gaudí Institute. He was also the advisor for the Parafernalia S.R.L. art gallery between 1993 and 1997.

Villacorta was also the director for the Quidam Cultural Action Association since January 2000. He was in charge of the management at the Luis Miró Quesada Cultural Space of the Miraflores City Council, Lima, Perú. Along with Jose-Carlos Mariategui and Elisa Arca they led Alta Tecnología Andina, one of the longest standing and respected art, science and technology organisations in Latin America.

Villacorta lives in Lima.

== Works ==
He was responsible for the following expositions, among others: Desplazamientos/Carlos Runcie Tanaka (curatorship); Luz Cuerpo Materia/Xawiery Wolsky (curatorship); Lo Sagrado de lo Profano (Co-curatorship); La Palabra del Otro (Co- curatorship); Carlos Revilla: Retrospective 1955-1995 (Co-curatorship); Horizontes Paralelos (Co-curatorship); Documentos: Tres Décadas de Fotografía Peruana 1960–1990 (Co- curatorship); ¿¡Kontrakultura!?/Herbert Rodríguez: Retrospectiva del Arte alternativo en Lima, 1979–1997 (curatorship); Iter Erraticus / Alberto Casari: Retrospective 1977–1993 (curatorship); Billy Hare: Fotografías (curatorship); Ramiro Llona: Retrospective 1973–1998 (curatorship); Naturaleza Artificial (curatorship); Geografía de los No-Lugares (curatorship); Pacto con el Momento Incierto (Co- curatorship).

In 1999, as a member of Espacios & Márgenes, Villa Corta realized co-curatorship of the Peruvian visual arts scene from 1979 through 1999. It was made up by five thematic expositions, inside the “El Laberinto de la Choledad” Project. It was sponsored by the Hivos Foundation. A recent curatorial project that gained international attention was called "CrossFire," a project that was based on a series of photographs by photographer Shahidul Alam (who is from Dhaka).

== Publications ==
Franquicias Imaginarias. las Opciones Estéticas en las Artes Plásticas en el Perú de Fin de Siglo. Artes, Ciencias y Humanidades. Cuestiones y Perspectivas (with Max Hernández) Fondo Editorial de la PUCP, 2003.

"Videografías In(visibles): una selección de videoarte latinoamericano 2000 - 2005," (a selection of video art from Latin-America with José-Carlos Mariátegui) "Museo Patio Herreriano (and touring around Latin America), Alta Tecnología Andina, Valladolid, 2005. http://www.videografiasinvisibles.org/
