= Chrisanthi Avgerou =

Greek-born scholar and computer scientist

Chrisanthi Avgerou FBCS FAIS
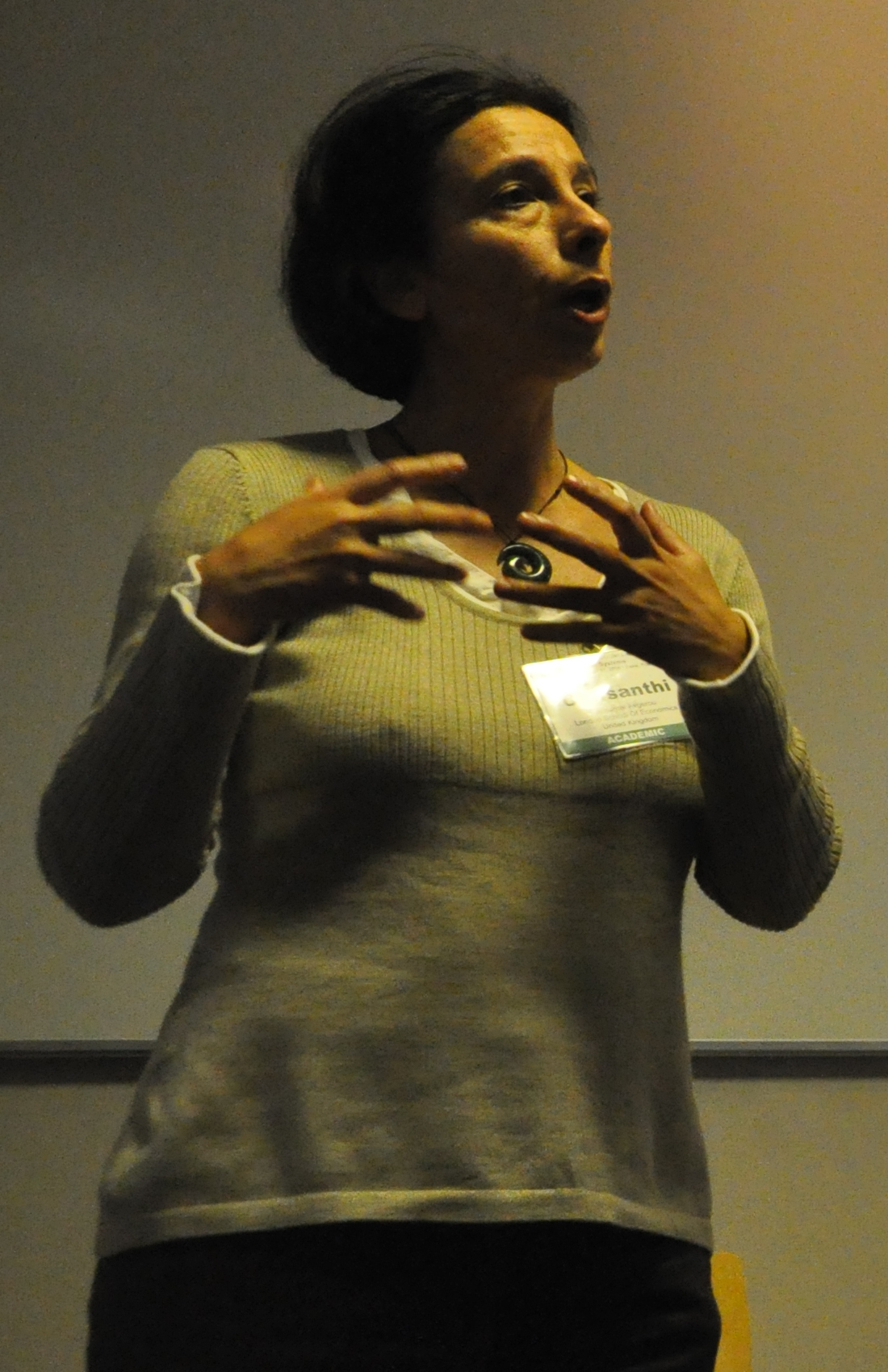
- Born: 1954 (age 71–72); Greece
- Education: University of Athens
- Employer: London School of Economics and Political Science
- Awards: Fellow of the British Computer Society and the Association for Information Systems

Chrisanthi Avgerou (Greek: Χρυσάνθη Αυγέρου; born 1954) is a Greek-born British scholar in the field of Social Study of Information Systems, focusing on Information Technology in developing countries. She is currently Professor of Information Systems at the London School of Economics and Political Science.

== Life ==
Avgerou is a Fellow of the British Computer Society and of the Association for Information Systems (AIS), associate editor of The Information Society journal and Information Systems research Journal, and has served as chairperson of the IFIP Technical Committee 9, which explores the relationship between computers and society.

She has a BSc in mathematics from University of Athens, an MSc in computer science from the Loughborough University and a PhD in Information Systems from the London School of Economics.

== Published books ==
- Avgerou, C., R. Mansell, D. Quah, and D. Silverstone (2007) The Oxford Handbook of Information and Communication Technologies, Oxford University Press.
- Perspectives and Policies on ICT in Society, Springer (2005) (co-edited with J. Berleur) ISBN 0-387-25587-7.
- The Social Study of Information and Communication Technology, Oxford University Press (2004) (co-edited with C. Ciborra and F. Land) ISBN 0-19-925356-0
- Information systems and the economics of innovation, Cheltenham, Edward Elgar (2003) (co-edited with R. Lèbre LaRovere) ISBN 1-84376-018-5.
- Information Systems and Global Diversity, Oxford, Oxford University Press (2002).
- Information Technology in Context: studies from the perspective of developing countries, London, Ashgate (2000) (co-edited with G. Walsham).
- Chrisanthi Avgerou and Tony Cornford, Developing Information Systems: Concepts, Issues and Practice, 2nd Edition, Palgrave (1998), ISBN 0-333-73231-6.
