= Social informatics =

Subfield between informatics and sociology

Social informatics is the study of information and communication tools in cultural or institutional contexts. Another definition is the interdisciplinary study of the design, uses and consequences of information technologies that takes into account their interaction with institutional and cultural contexts. A transdisciplinary field, social informatics is part of a larger body of socio-economic research that examines the ways in which the technological artifact and human social context mutually constitute the information and communications technology (ICT) ensemble. Some proponents of social informatics use the relationship of a biological community to its environment as an analogy for the relationship of tools to people who use them. The Center for Social Informatics founded by the late Dr. Rob Kling, an early champion of the field's ideas, defines the field thus:

Social Informatics (SI) refers to the body of research and study that examines social aspects of computerization – including the roles of information technology in social and organizational change, the uses of information technologies in social contexts, and the ways that the social organization of information technologies is influenced by social forces and social practices.

== Research ==
Historically, Western European concepts of social informatics research has been strong in the Scandinavian countries and the UK. The beginnings can be traced to the 1980s in Norway and Slovenia. The fundamentals of social informatics in the USA were laid by Kling in 1996 with his colleagues and students from Indiana University. Within North America, the field is represented largely through independent research efforts at a number of diverse institutions. There are several approaches, which were historically named or classified as social informatics: American, Russian, British, Norwegian, Slovenian, German and Japanese. The oldest concept of social informatics was founded in the USSR by A.V. Sokolov and his colleagues in the 1970s.

Social informatics research diverges from earlier, deterministic (both social and technological) models for measuring the social impacts of technology. Such technological deterministic models characterized information technologies as tools to be installed and used with a pre-determined set of impacts on society which are dictated by the technology's stated capabilities. Similarly, the socially deterministic theory represented by some proponents of the social construction of technology (SCOT) or social shaping of technology theory as advocated by Williams & Edge (1996) see technology the product of human social forces. In contrast, some social informatics methodologies consider the context surrounding technology and the material properties of the technology to be equally important: the people who will interact with a system, the organizational policies governing work practice, and support resources. This contextual inquiry produces "nuanced conceptual understanding" of systems that can be used to examine issues like access to technology, electronic forms of communication, and large-scale networks.

Research in social informatics can be categorized into three orientations. Normative research focuses on the development of theories based on empirical analysis that may be used to develop organizational policies and work practices. The heart of such analyses lies in socio-technical interaction networks, a framework built around the idea that humans and the technologies they build are "co-constitutive", bound together, and that any examination of one must necessarily consider the other. Studies of the analytical orientation develop theory or define methodologies to contribute to theorizing in institutional settings. Critical analysis, like Lucy Suchman’s examination of articulation work, examine technological solutions from non-traditional perspectives in order to influence design and implementation.

== Future ==
Social informatics is a young intellectual movement and its future is still being defined. However, because SST theorists such as Williams and Edge suggest that the amorphous boundaries between humans and technology that emerge in social shaping technology research indicate that technology is not a distinct social endeavor worthy of individual study, indicating that there is a need for social informatics research that bridges the gap between technological and social determinism. This observation, coupled with the many fields that contribute research, suggest a future in which social informatics theories and concepts settle to form a substrate, an "indispensable analytical foundation" for work in other disciplines. Such foundations can be found in social informatics frameworks such as The Web of Computing perspective or Socio-Technical Interaction Networks.

Relevant topics about future direction of social informatics are discussed in the book by Fichman and Rosenbaum. Conceptualization of international discourse, including current trends in research and direction of social informatics development is presented in an article by Smutny. This article discusses current possibilities of development of social informatics within the international discourse of various concepts including possible areas for future cooperation. Other topical article by Marcinkowski presents a perspective shift from studying only the effects of the implementation and use of technology to the primary discussion of what are the ideological implications of empirical work in social informatics connected with data analytics approach.

== In education ==
Social informatics is also about teaching social issues of computing to computer science students. Depending on educational traditions, social informatics is scattered in the curriculum of different disciplines, as well as in computer science, information science, informatics (Europe) and web sociology. In some instances there might be a lack of understanding of why teaching social issues of computing is important, both by individual lecturers and students, resulting in a view that social informatics is boring and without importance. Some researchers have pointed out that in order to create awareness of the importance of social issues of computing, one has to focus on didactics of social informatics.

== See also ==
- Community informatics
- Computational social science
- Computer-mediated communication
- E-social science
- Hyperpersonal model
- Information policy
- Social identity model of deindividuation effects (SIDE)
- Social information processing theory
- Social Study of Information Systems
- Sociology of the Internet
- Urban informatics
