= Tulipamwe =

Tulipamwe, is an independently funded artists project coordinated by the Tulipamwe Arts Trust in Namibia. The trust is organized under the Visual & Performing Arts Department of the University of Namibia and is affiliated to the Triangle Network of Workshops initiated by Sir Robert Lauder.

== Introduction ==
Historically, Namibia has been isolated for over fifty years from the rest of the world due to the politics of the apartheid government in South Africa, especially from greater Africa. This isolation has been in almost every sphere of interaction, particularly in the arts. South Africa’s policy of destabilization of its neighbours ensured that Namibians did not interact peacefully with the Frontline States. Since its independence (1989) and the establishment of democracy in South Africa (1994), this isolation has been addressed in multiple different ways. Namibians are encouraged to see themselves as part of Africa rather than just a part of South Africa. Tulipamwe has been a major force to open up Namibia’s arts to the rest of Africa and the world, as well as the introduction of foreign artists to Namibia.

Tulipamwe, meaning ‘we are together’, aims to fulfill the promise of its name as an international workshop. The first Tulipamwe International Artists Workshop was held in 1994. Workshops bring together about 20 artists from all over the world, from countries such as Uganda, Zimbabwe, Mauritius, Rwanda, South Africa, Nigeria, Spain, USA, and Germany. The selection process is strictly monitored by members of the organizational committee. The criteria for selection is based on the work submitted with the application, what the artist could bring to the workshop, and how much the artist is expected to gain from it, allowing for both students and professional artists to gain and receive in equal measures. Artists are not expected to come with any preparation, but rather to be open to new ideas in a new environment.

Tulipamwe is funded annually by sponsors, such as the Triangle Trust and the Ford Foundation, as well as foreign embassies operating in Windhoek. It depends entirely on the support of these sponsors, as it is a non-profit organization.

In 2008, Tulipamwe was held at Okombahe. Five local residents of Okombahe participated. After the long process of organizing and coordinating the artists met, travelled to Okombahe and worked together for two solid weeks. Both International artists and local artists where encouraged to experiment with different materials and styles, giving the artists the opportunity to learn from each other. Seven nations, including Namibia, were represented.

== Brief history of Tulipamwe (1994–2003) ==
The Tulipamwe project was founded in 1994. Since then more than 200 Namibian artists and international artists have taken part in successful workshops. The Tulipamwe workshops have been held in different locations; each of these was chosen for its peaceful atmosphere and more recently for the surrounding community. Tulipamwe has gone through a series of small changes over the last 14 years as it has changed hands three times during this time.

The Tulipamwe project was originally inspired by the Triangle Trust's workshop model. This was an international model on which a number of other similar projects have been based. Tulipamwe was founded in Namibia with the help of a consultant from the UK, Anna Kindersly, who co-ordinated the first workshop in 1994. The coordination was then taken over by the staff of the Visual Arts Department of the University of Namibia (UNAM). UNAM and the working group hosted six International Artists Workshops until 1999. These workshops all concentrated on the artists’ creative exploration. From 1999 to 2004 Tulipamwe was independently run by a Namibian artist, Jo Rogge. Four international workshops were held during this time. In 2005 it returned to the management of UNAM. The aims were then revived and revised and the workshops started again in 2008.

1994 – Otjiwa Game Lodge The first international artists' workshop in Namibia was held at Otjiwa Game Lodge. The workshop was highly anticipated and much was expected of it.

“In planning, the working group anticipated that the Tulipamwe process would address a broad spectrum of creative issues relevant to contemporary Namibian art. What however could not have been anticipated was the degree of success. Not only did the workshop address these predicted issues but it generated an exceptionally high degree of creative energy, experimentation, and learning-through-sharing” (Francois de Necker, at the time a member of the working group)

It is clear that Tulipamwe exceeded its aims, this can be seen not only in the statements made by the participants and organizers but also by the fact that it continues to be promoted today. In this workshop the main impromptu educational focus was on sculpture. A lot of Namibian artists such as Silverius Olibile and Trudi Dicks started their first sculpture pieces at Tulipamwe with the help of sculptors from Zimbabwe, SA and Zambia. Artists attended from: Botswana, Namibia, UK, USA, Germany, France, Mozambique, Zambia, Zimbabwe, Senegal and South-Africa.

1995 – Peperkorrel Farm Tulipamwe was then held at Peperkorrel Farm, this farm is the home and studio of internationally famous Namibian sculptor Dorte Berner. The coordinator of this workshop was Hercules Viljoen, a Namibian artist who is head of the visual arts department at UNAM. Because of the different backgrounds of the artists who attend these workshops different opinions are often argued over. In 1995 a spontaneous and rather explosive debate erupted over the relevance and validity of abstract art, the debate ended amicably and so Tulipamwe was all the more rewarding and renewing. The final exhibit at the end of the workshop brought with it a totally new experience for the National Gallery of Namibia. This was the first time that an installation piece was exhibited in the space. This installation, called ‘Territories viii: Dreams of Africa”, was produced by Jack Beng-Thi a visiting artist from France-Reunion.

Artists attended from France-Reunion, Congo, Namibia, UK, Germany, Zambia, Zimbabwe and South-Africa.

1996 – Zebra River Lodge Hercules Viljoen coordinated this workshop at Zebra River Lodge, a country lodge in the south of Namibia situated in the beautiful Zebra River Valley. This Tulipamwe, like all the others, had the aim of encouraging the free flow of ideas and information between professional artists from within Namibia and from abroad. This meeting of artistic minds has been described as "an exciting and stimulating experience of personal growth that can not be duplicated other than in a similar workshop situation" by Cathy McRoberts, a Namibian artist in 1996. This workshop inspired one of its participants, Samuel Amunkete, to further his education in the arts. In a similar way the land art, by Eric Pongerard from France-Reunion, inspired a number of the Namibian artists to continue in this style, and this is coming out more and more clearly today.

Artists attended from: Botswana, Namibia, Kenya, Zimbabwe, UK, India, South Africa, France-Reunion, Zambia, France, Germany and Spain

1997- Otjiruze Guest Lodge By the fourth annual workshop, Tulipamwe had become one of the major annual events in the Namibian cultural calendar. The coordinator of this workshop, held at Otjiruze Guest Lodge, was Hercules Viljoen. The location of this workshop resounded so well with the artists that it was used again for the next two Tulipamwe workshops. This workshop brought out in its participants a wish to express their own social, political, moral, and religious beliefs. Eric Schnack, from Namibia, produced work depicting his disgust for game hunting. Max Edison, from Namibia, used his work to bring awareness to mistreated women and children. Moitshepi Mandidela, from Botswana, worked mainly on works that revolved around religion, his primary piece was called ‘My peoples religion’ Artists attended from: Australia, Mozambique, Namibia, Zambia, UK, South-Africa, France-Reunion, France, Germany and Spain

1998- Otjiruze Guest Lodge This was the last workshop coordinated by Hercules Viljoen before it became a privately run project in 1999. Nine of the participating Namibian artists had attended Tulipamwe workshops previously and were able to build on their experiences and skills. This is an important part of the workshop.

1999- Otjiruze Guest Farm Jo Rogge coordinated and ran Tulipamwe in 1999 and in spite of the change in coordinator the ethos remained the same. Seven of the participants had attended Tulipamwe before. Artists attended from: Namibia, Denmark, Botswana, Spain, Norway, Uganda, Zimbabwe, Mozambique, Rwanda, Germany, South Africa, Finland and Zambia.

'2000 - Kansimba Game Lodge 'This workshop was held at a lodge near Karibib in the Erongo region and was coordinated by Jo Rogge. The participant from Zimbabwe, Chiko, remained after the workshop to host a series of printmaking classes at the John Muafangejo Art Centre. Artists attended from: Namibia, Norway, Zimbabwe, Finland, Zambia, South Africa, UK, Germany, Botswana, France and Spain.

2001 – Gobabeb Research Station The experiences of the artists at the Gobabeb Research Station tended to be more tranquil and serene. This was mainly because the research station is in the middle of the desert, on the divide between the dune fields and the gravel plains, and is situated in an extremely barren area. This seems to have had an effect on the art produced, much of it inspired by nature. The artist from Ireland, Janet Crimble made a large piece of land art in the riverbed made entirely of the pods from the indigenous trees. Francois Niay made large drawings of natural objects. Artists attended from: Namibia, Northern Ireland, Botswana, Spain, Finland, France, Mozambique, South Africa, Norway and Germany

2003 – Otjiruze Guest Farm This Tulipamwe was coordinated by Jo Rogge and had an emphasis on experience and professionalism. "Enthusiasm for participation over the years has not waned, rather, artists eagerly forward their applications". Sculpture and installation art once again were a huge portion of the work produced. Artists attended from: Namibia, Uganda, France, Mozambique, Finland, Norway, Zimbabwe.

== Sponsorship ==
The Tulipamwe Arts Trust is an independent body attached to the University of Namibia which provides some logistical and administrative support but the workshops need to be funded annually. It is approved by the Ministry of Basic Education and Culture as well as the National Art Gallery of Namibia. The coordinator and the working group seek funding each year for the running of the workshop. The funding is used for transport, accommodation, catering, materials and publicity. Traditionally the workshop is funded by international donors such as HIVOS, a Dutch funding agency and the Ford Foundation. Funding is also acquired from local international agencies such as the Goethe Centre, the American Cultural Centre, the Franco Namibian Cultural Centre and UNESCO. The private sector in Namibia has also provided funding in the form of services and materials. The funders are acknowledged widely in the press as well as in the catalogues and on the web site. An Open Day is held at the end of the workshop to give an opportunity for the sponsors to meet and talk to the artists in their studios and to view the work created. At the end of a workshop the donors are presented with an artwork in thanks for their sponsorship.

== Art Workshop Networks ==
Triangle Arts Trust is an umbrella organization that facilitates and supports various workshop initiatives in 23 countries all over the world. It helps to support at least 10 different workshop organizations in Sub-Saharan Africa. Artists often attend more than one workshop in various countries and start to form connections with countries, arts institutions and artists all over the region. Some of these workshops are: Thapong – Botswana, Thupelo – South Africa, Aftershave – Nigeria, Batapata – Zimbabwe, Kuona – Kenya, Insaka – Zambia Uta Goeble-Gross, from Germany, compared her experience at the 2008 Tulipamwe workshop to two other workshops she had attended in Cape Town. While these urban experiences were both educative and useful to the communities, they lacked the connection she felt to the other artists at Tulipamwe. She felt that the isolation in the empty landscape made it a more individual experience and so allowed her to expand, and work on a bigger scale.

Arterial is an arts network for Africa and provides active network of individuals, organizations, sponsors, companies, and institutions all of which deal with African culture and the arts. This Network was formed to support African arts and to aid the growth of creative projects in Africa. An example of one of Arterials workshops was one that was held recently in Zimbabwe, Harare, it dealt with the marketing strategies of arts organizations. Tulipamwe makes use of networks such as this one and Triangle to advertise their workshops.

== Benefits to artists and to the community ==
In 1994 Tulipamwe was coordinated by Anna Kindersley, from England, she described the benefits of Tulipamwe.

“The benefits emanating from such a workshop are many and varied. The positive effects in participants’ work may sometimes be seen months later together with the knock-on effects for the artists’ respective community or country. The inaugural Tulipamwe has created new and important networks between artists in SA, West Africa, Europe, and USA. This will open new horizons for Namibian artists such as opportunities to participate in sister workshops and to exhibit and work in other countries.”

When the aims of Tulipamwe changed to focus on community development (2008) the value of the Tulipamwe project also increased. The local artists who participate in Tulipamwe have the opportunity to apply their creativity in a cultural context and to pass on skills to their community. This may change the perception of artists as people who are willing to share skills and knowledge as opposed to people reliant on community aid. The idea that art can be an income generating activity is also now encouraged.

== Location ==
Tulipamwe is located in rural communities. Uta Goebel-Gross (2008; Germany) explained in her interview how the islolated environment allowed her to expand as an artist. There are no chores and artists may focus on their craft.

In 2008 it was particularly clear that Okombahe, its people and environment, featured strongly in the art works produced. Okombahe - the "Place of the Giraffe" appeared in the imagery of paintings and large ceramics were made out of clay from the Omaruru river and were fired in a self-built kiln. Found materials (seed pods, rusty tins) were in artworks and installations. As Seth Basson, a member of the Okombahe community stated, "I learned that you can make beautiful things from scratch, trees and waste".

Personal benefits to artists

== Local Namibian Artists ==
The fact that Tulipamwe was first of all a learning workshop was reiterated by a number of the local artists who participated. They were often exposed to western art for the first time and a number of them learnt about abstract and conceptual art from a different perspective. Links were formed across language barriers and multiple local artists worked in new ways for the first time. Like Ester Ihuhwa a Namibian craftsperson “I enjoyed painting on canvas for the first time. I was very happy to meet new friends from so many different places.” Dias Machate( 1994 Mozambique). “I’m a teacher but Tulipamwe was anyway a constellation of knowledges: a university in which anyone may become a student of another through exchanges of experience.”

== Foreign Artists ==
Foreign artists often do not know what to expect from Namibia or Tulipamwe, the experience of working in a rural African setting is often daunting but nonetheless rewarding. Simon Faithfull, from Britain, participate in the 1997 Tulipamwe project, during his time there he wrote a journal of his experience. He worked both as a conceptual and installation artist. In an unusual turnabout, foreign artists are usually more isolated in their own workspaces than local artists, this is because in the large cities they come from they are pressed for studio space and find it hard to work in groups because there is a lack of space. Generally in developed countries people are isolated by their living arrangements, which are very different from the communal living apparent in less developed countries. African artists often share resources, materials, and space. They tend to work together on projects this perhaps originated in the communal making of traditional functional objects such as baskets and pots. In the words of a German Tulipamwe participant: “Artists are usually solitary and to be forced to work as a group is unusual and challenging. For me it was a journey of self-discovery where all the artists worked together and helped each other.” Exposure to raw materials such as clay from riverbeds, abundant indigenous wood and found materials has been inspirational to a number of the foreign participants.

Tulipamwe 2008 held in Okombahe, as an international artists workshop, was dormant for the 3 years between 2004 and 2007. This was due to a lack of committed people with time to organize an event like this. The new Tulipamwe was launched in 2007 with new commitment from UNAM to ensure that the project was sustainable. A new working group was gathered together; who would be responsible for the organization, funding and selecting of participants. Tulipamwe was legally constituted as the Tulipamwe Arts Trust and a Board of Trustees was formed, the trustees are high profile members of the Namibian art community as well as a lawyer and an accountant. In 2007 it was decided to work towards the first workshop in 2008.

The original vision for Tulipamwe was not changed, instead it was given broader aims that encompassed a much larger goal. Tulipamwe now focuses not only on artistic development but also on helping needy communities by holding the workshop in their vicinity and including community members in the program.

== The aims of the Tulipamwe Community Empowerment project ==
1. To create an invigorating artistic environment for Namibian artists to share creative skills with each other and with international artists.

2. To provide international artists with the opportunity to work in a unique African environment where they can explore new creative avenues.

3. To benefit a disadvantaged community by bringing positive energy, activity and community engagement to it through visual arts initiatives.

4. To allow the community the initiative to share in Tulipamwe’s funding by providing workshop facilities, accommodation and meals to workshop participants.

5. To celebrate local traditions and culture as integral part of the global community.

6. To create the opportunity for development in visual art, thereby contributing to Namibia’s cultural capital.

It was decided to hold the next Tulipamwe International Workshop in a rural community. Various communities were investigated. Among those investigated was Gibeon and Bathseba, in the south; however, they were not chosen due to the lack of interest shown by community leaders. Instead the elders of the village council at Okombahe in the Erongo region near Omaruru were approached. Okombahe showed enthusiasm and could provide accommodation in the form of a large community house. The community was also able to provide catering services and had several interested artists who wished to participate. Six of these artists were chosen by the community elders and came in on a daily basis to work with the other artists. Through the different artist’s networks, including the Triangle Trust, a call for applications from international artists was sent out. There was an overwhelming response and the fundraising began. By May 2008 the selection process was complete. Artists from Mauritius, SA, USA, France, Germany and Botswana as well as 12 from Namibia where chosen to participate. Due to insufficient funds a lot of the artists had to fund their own travel costs.

Tulipamwe 2008 was held in Okombahe (place of the giraffe) The following artists participated in Tulipamwe 2008: Nirveda Alleck, a painter and installation artist from Mauritius; Diana Hyslop, an object maker from South Africa; Hannah Naomi Kim, a new media artist and painter from the USA; Raphael Caloone an animator and sculptor from France; Uta Goebel- Gross a painter from Germany; Kim Modise a painter from Botswana; Shiya Karuseb an installation artist and print maker from Namibia; Gretta Nashongo a textile maker from Namibia; Helena Iitembu a painter from Namibia; John Nampala a ceramic artist from Namibia; Abneil Enkali a mixed media artist from Namibia; and Barbara Böhlke a painter from Namibia. Hulda Gomachas, Cecilia Gowases, Seth Basson, Sandro! Naruseb, MC Henry Gomachab and Ebeneyus Ebos were the participating Okombahe Community Artists.

The artists arrived from their various countries a few days before the workshop. They were accommodated in a Bed and Breakfast. They spent the following few days getting to know one another in Windhoek. On the 16th of August all of the artists were transported to Okombahe with the use of UNAM combis. The Artists immediately got to work and started to experiment with new media. Half way through the workshop the artists were taken to the Brandberge on an outing. This was an astonishing experience for both the Namibian and foreign artists as some of them had never been to this area.

Open day was held on the 29th of August, press, sponsors and other interested parties all attended. They were shown around the area and were given the chance to see the work that had been produced in the space where it had been made, they were also able to talk to the artists about the process of production.

After the workshop back in Windhoek a public discussion was organized and held at the FNCC (Franco Namibian Cultural Center), and an exhibition of selected works was held at the Goethe Center. The exhibition was opened by Joy Sasman, the chairperson of the Board of Trustees; quite a few sales were made.
