= Danum shield =

Roman shield found in Doncaster, England

Coordinates: 53.5254°N 1.1340°W

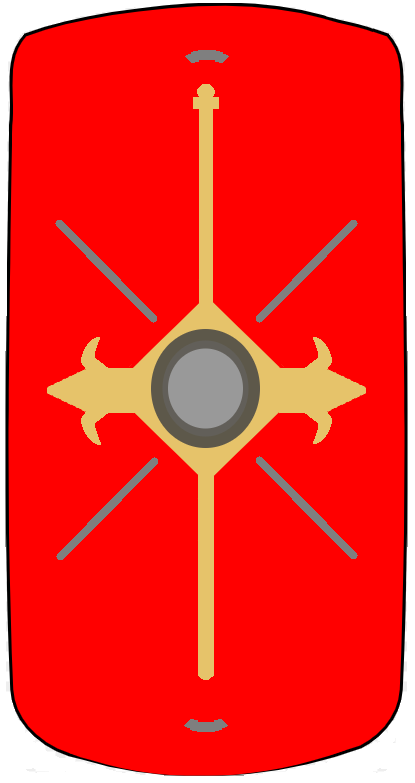
The possible appearance of the Danum Shield based on Buckland's 1978 work. The original paint colour of the shield is not known

The Danum shield was a Roman shield found in the Danum Roman fort at Doncaster in 1971. It was discovered amid the remains of a bonfire and may have been intentionally disposed of during the partial abandonment of the fort. The shield was rectangular in shape and measured approximately 0.65 metres (2.1 ft) by 1.25 metres (4.1 ft). It is considered to have been part of the equipment of a Roman auxilium (non-citizen) soldier. An assessment in the 1970s considered it to have had an unusual vertical hand grip, suggesting a possible use by cavalry. However a recent work suggests the handgrip may have been horizontal and the shield used by an infantryman. The shield was covered in leather and was probably painted, though its original colour is not known. The outer face was decorated with bronze sheeting, possibly incised with a Celtic pattern.

The iron boss and handgrip, together with other iron and bronze remains, are on display at the Doncaster Museum and Art Gallery. A reconstruction of the shield, made in 1978, is also on display. The exhibition is due to relocate to the new Danum Gallery, Library and Museum later in 2020.

== Discovery ==
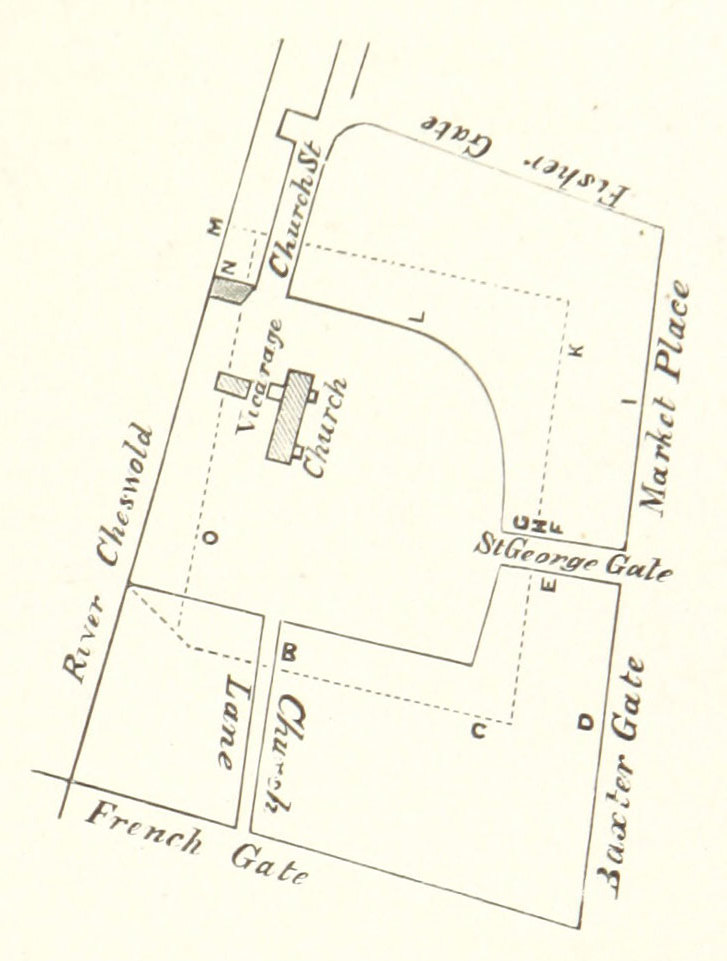
Map showing the Minster and Danum fort outline

The Danum shield was discovered during excavations near St George's Minster, Doncaster in 1971. The excavations investigated the city's Roman fort, Danum, ahead of the construction of the Inner Ring Road. Danum was constructed and occupied as early as the Vespasian era (69–79 AD) but was abandoned when the army campaigned in Caledonia (modern Scotland) on the orders of Gnaeus Julius Agricola (governor of Britannia 77–85 AD). The fort seems to have been demolished by the Romans in a controlled manner at the time of its abandonment. After 87 AD the fort was reconstructed on the same site to house a larger garrison made up of soldiers who had by then been withdrawn from Caledonia. This Flavian-Hadrianic era timber fort was replaced by a stone fort in the Antonine era.

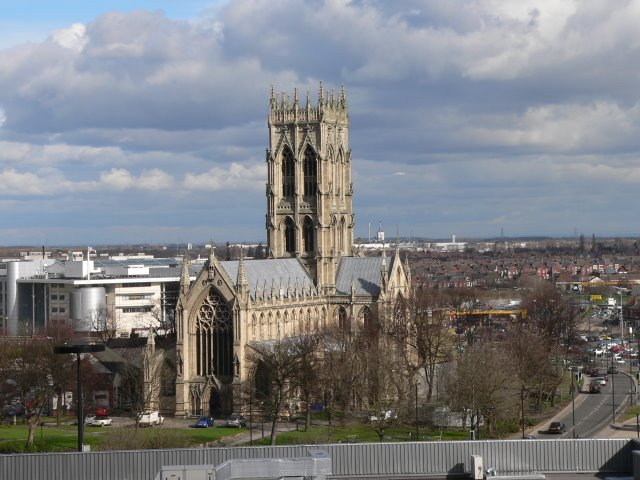
St George's Minster and Inner Ring Road (right)

Excavations through one of the Antonine fort's ramparts found that much of the 2-metre (6.6 ft) rampart had been obliterated by a mediaeval cellar. Evidence showed that this site lay near to one of the internal roads of the Flavian-Hadrianic fort. Beneath the cellar floor a layer, a few centimetres (approx one inch) thick, was found that proved to be the remains of a bonfire, possibly associated with the abandonment of the fort. The remains of the Danum shield were discovered close to the edge of the bonfire layer, lying on a north-south orientation. The shield's iron shield boss and hand grip were first noticed, and further excavation revealed the remains of a full shield lying face down and partially turned to charcoal. The remains had been partly disturbed by a trench associated with the Antonine fort and a wild animal run. The charcoal preserved details of three layers of wood used to form the board of the shield and also a black, vitrified, vesicular material that was thought to be the remains of a leather outer covering.

The shield was photographed in situ with a gamma camera in an attempt to discern the arrangement of any metal fittings on the front face. This was largely unsuccessful as the bronze fittings were too corroded to show up on the photograph and the iron fittings, which passed right through the shield, had already been mapped from the back (top) face. The shield was considered too delicate to recover by hand excavation so was lifted in a single block, encased in plaster and weighing 30 long hundredweight (1,500 kg). This block was then examined at the Ancient Monuments Laboratory in London by Leo Biek.

== Description ==
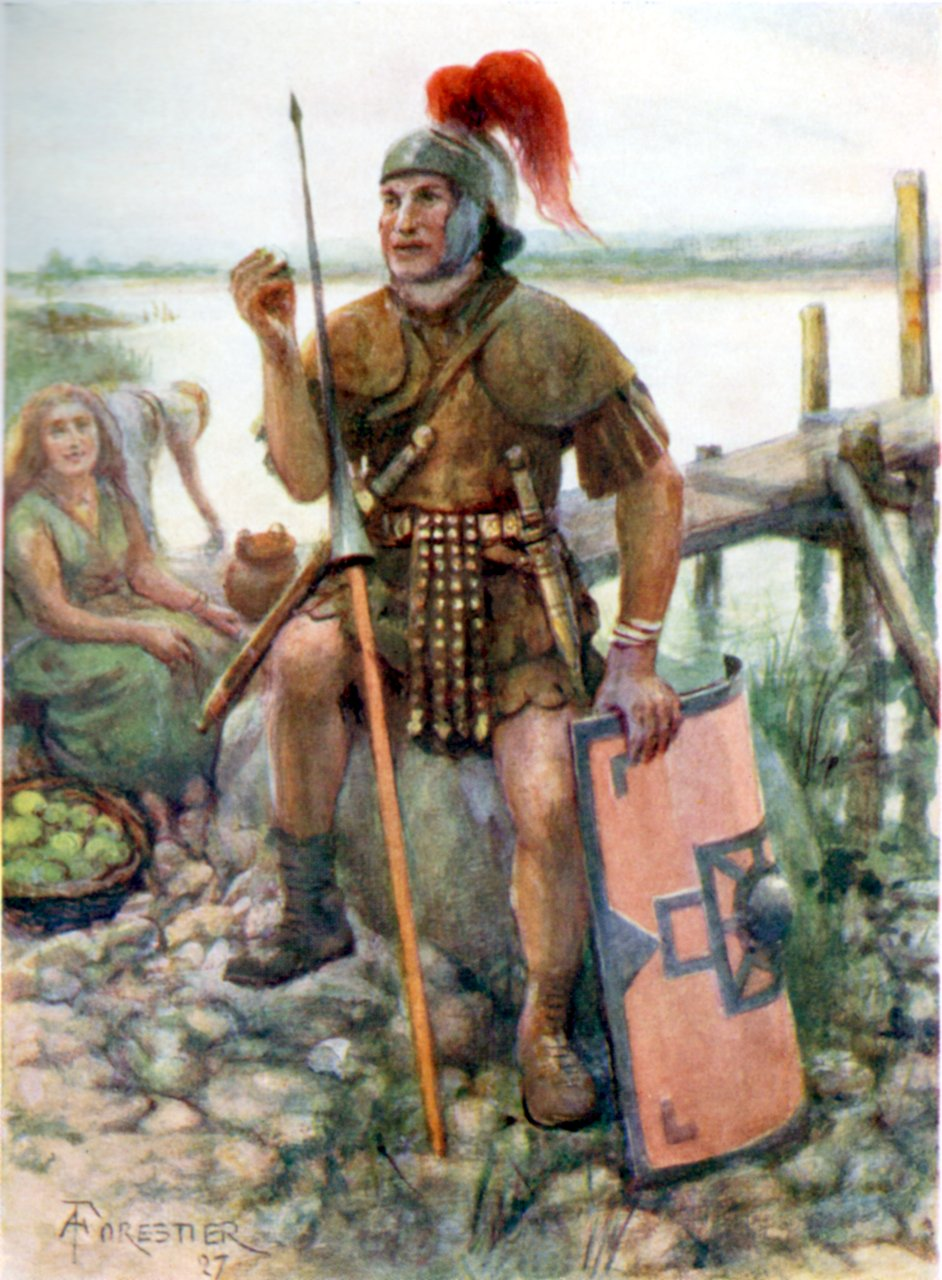
A 1927 painting of a Roman auxiliary soldier in Britain, by Amédée Forestier.

Fewer than ten Roman shields have been discovered by archaeologists so the Danum shield represents an important example of this type of artefact. The Danum shield has been dated to the late 1st century/early 2nd century and attributed to a Roman auxiliary soldier (auxiliarius), though because of the variation in equipment among these forces this identification cannot be certain. Archaeologist Paul Buckland published his evaluation of the shield in 1978, based on evidence from the original excavation and the subsequent investigations carried out at the Ancient Monuments Laboratory.

=== Buckland (1978) ===
In Buckland's assessment the board of the shield, which had largely deteriorated, was broadly rectangular, with a curved top and bottom, and measured at 0.64 metres (2.1 ft) in width and a maximum of 1.25 metres (4.1 ft) in length. Based on the size of iron rivets used in its construction the board measured around 10 millimetres (0.39 in) in thickness. The shield was flat in profile, not curved as the famous Roman scutum shield. The board was made from three layers of wood; a centre of oak with outer layers of alder joined by glue. The centre was made from six staves of wood, approximately 3.8 millimetres (0.15 in) thick, arranged in a vertical orientation, while the outer layers were of staves around 3.2 millimetres (0.13 in) thick laid in a horizontal orientation. The staves varied but measured 103–110 millimetres (4.1–4.3 in) in width. The shield board was not banded in iron along its edge as some other Roman shields were. This would have made it less durable in battle against opponents with slashing weapons such as swords. It may be that the design was intentional and worked to trap an opponent's sword if it struck the shield's edge, or that the shield was intended for use only against spear-armed opponents.

The domed shield boss was 200 millimetres (7.9 in) in diameter and made of 2-millimetre (0.079 in) thick iron. It was positioned 50 millimetres (2.0 in) vertically above the centre of the shield and affixed to it by four iron rivets driven through a 28-millimetre (1.1 in) flange. The off-centre position of the boss would cause the bottom portion of the shield to tip towards the user, protecting their legs. On the rear of the shield was a 0.8-metre (2.6 ft) vertical iron hand grip, secured by six iron rivets. The rivets were hidden on the front of the shield by a spina, a wooden rib 28–33 millimetres (1.1–1.3 in) wide and 5 millimetres (0.20 in) thick running vertically down the centre of the face, this had no structural value. The handgrip showed evidence of being repaired, possibly due to breakage of the grip or because the rivets pulled out. The spina was removed, and the hand grip reattached with nails driven through the rivet holes and bent over, the spina was then reattached.

Microscopic fragments showed that the centre of the grip, behind the boss, was bound with leather where it would have been held by the soldier's hand. During combustion the boss and the grip had sprung away from the shield board, taking some of the wood with them. The short depth of the boss would have left the user's shield-holding hand vulnerable to impact from blows against the outside of the boss; it is possible that a padding of horse-hair was used here as with the Caerhun shield. The boss showed evidence of an attempt being made to remove it prior to the disposal of the shield by burning, possibly to salvage it for reuse. A leather thong may have been provided from the grip to the soldier's wrist to spread the weight of the shield and to prevent its loss in battle. An iron ferrule was found on the handgrip and, with an eyelet affixed to the back of the shield board, may have been used to affix a leather shoulder strap for carrying the shield.

There was evidence that a leather cover was affixed to the inner and outer faces of the shield, which could have been formed from a single cow hide. This was likely to have originally been painted, though no evidence of the original colour was found. The leather covering was pierced by decorative lines of iron studs around 10 millimetres (0.39 in) in diameter and protruding from the face by 6 millimetres (0.24 in). One surviving run of studs radiated from around the boss and was probably mirrored in all four quadrants of the shield face. Other studs were found in 60-millimetre (2.4 in)-long crescent positioned 70 millimetres (2.8 in) from the base of the shield. It was assumed that a similar group would have been positioned at the top of the shield. These studs do not appear to have helped much with tensioning the leather cover, which would probably have had to have been glued to the board, but may have helped keep the separate wood layers bound together.

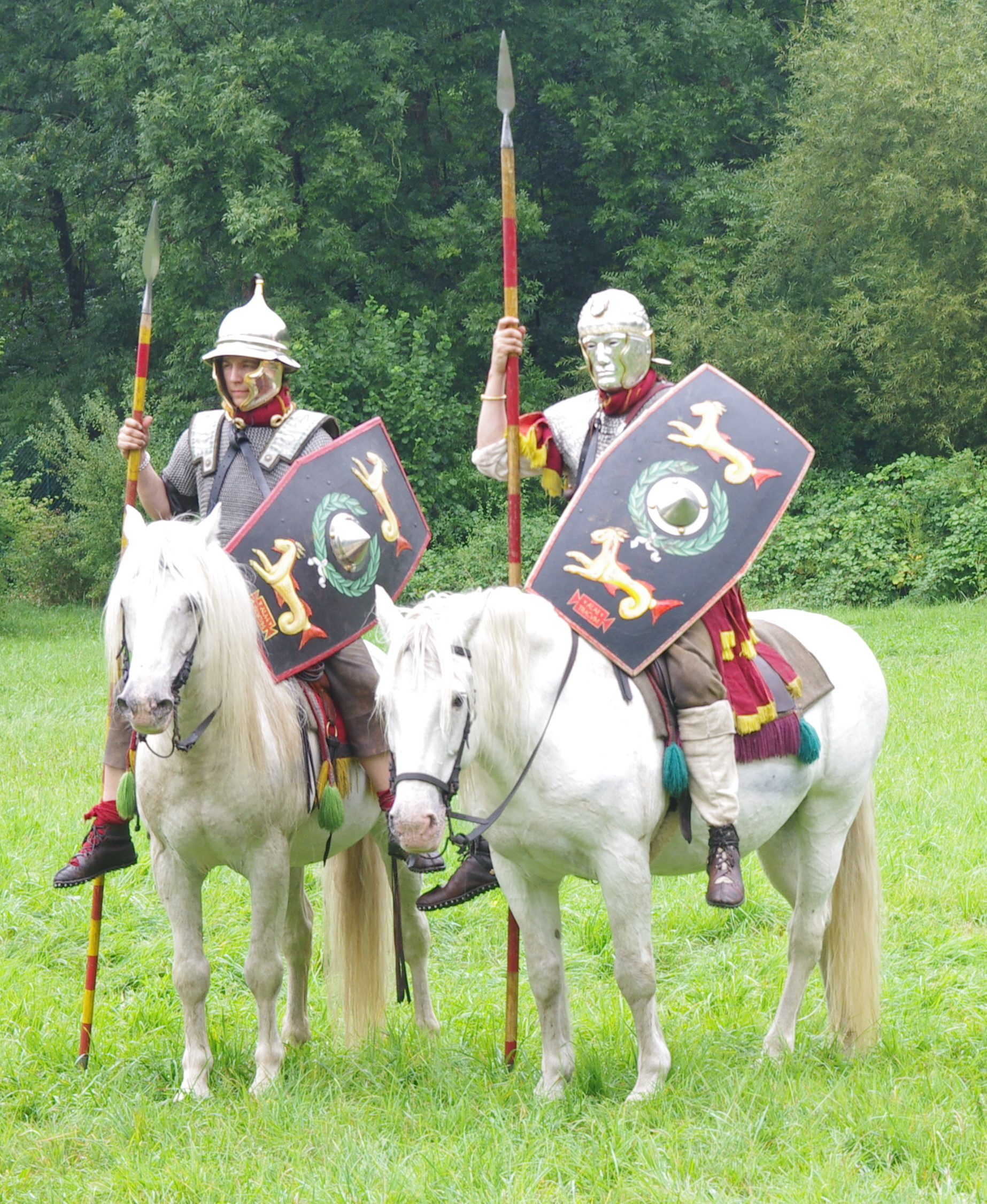
Modern Roman cavalry re-enactors with rectangular shields

The rivets through the handgrip retained fragments of bronze sheeting that probably decorated the shield face. Most of the bronzework seems to have been removed prior to the disposal of the shield. The original pattern of this cannot be known for certain but elements can be discerned from green corrosion products left in the underlying sand. The sheeting was secured by a number of 5-millimetre (0.20 in) and 8-millimetre (0.31 in) diameter bronze studs with a mixture of flat and domed heads. At least four studs radiated from the boss as extensions of the lines of iron studs on the shield face. The bronzework may have been inlaid with a chased pattern of curves and lines in a Celtic-style pattern, as the fragments had fractured along curved lines, and may have been used for tactical recognition on the battlefield.

The vertical grip used on the shield is rare in Roman finds, most others having horizontal grips with the exception of a shield, virtually identical to the Danum example, recovered at Trimontium fort in the Scottish borders and one near Strasbourg, France. The vertical grip would have made it awkward for used by an infantryman as it is more difficult to apply force through the shield than with a horizontal grip, as would be required in a melee. Buckland considered that the shield may have been used by a Roman auxiliary cavalryman, though noted that its weight was heavier than other known cavalry shields, which were made largely from leather.

Buckland considered that the shield might not have been Roman in origin, potentially being a trophy taken from a Gallic tribe, as it bears some resemblance to examples known from European iron age tribes. However, Buckland stated that the number and position of rivets on the shield probably gave it a Roman origin and it may have been brought over by an auxiliary soldier from Western continental Europe. Buckland considered it likely that the shield had been disposed of in the early 2nd century AD, possibly around 105 AD when the Roman army was withdrawn from Caledonia.

=== Travis & Travis reinterpretation (2014) ===
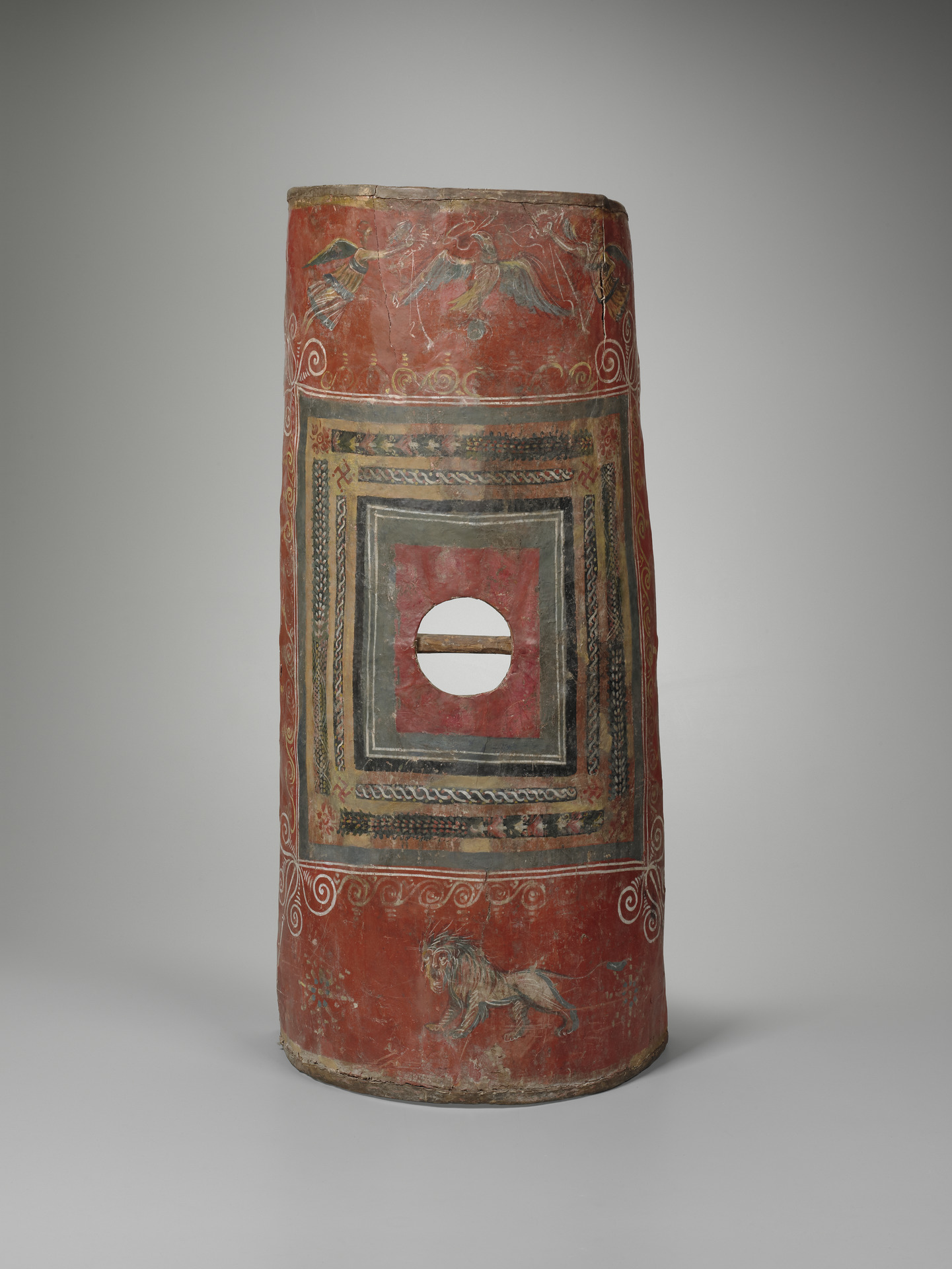
The Dura shield

Hilary & John Travis discussed the Danum shield in their 2014 book Roman Shields, and suggested that Buckland's findings were open to reinterpretation. Because the handgrip had become detached during combustion of the shield, it is possible that it had been, in fact, originally orientated horizontally. This would have lent it better to use by infantrymen. To match the orientation of wood grain recovered from the boss and grip for this interpretation to be true, the shield would have had to have been of two-ply construction, with the inner layer of wood orientated vertically and the outer layer horizontally. Travis & Travis suggest that the overall thickness of the shield would still have been 10 millimetres (0.39 in) and that the two layers would have been approximately 5 millimetres (0.20 in) each, rather than the 3–3.8 millimetres (0.12–0.15 in) of Buckland's three layers. A horizontally orientated handgrip would match the shields recovered at Faiyum Oasis and at Dura-Europos, as well as six iron handgrips recovered elsewhere.

Travis & Travis also suggested that the shield could originally have been of the more traditional curved rectangular shield shape, and that it had flattened out after disposal in the fire. A horizontally-orientated handgrip would have been more likely than a vertically orientated grip to spring away from a curved shield board in a fire. That the shield had been curved had been the original working assumption of Buckland during the 1971 excavation. Travis & Travis also suggest that, had the shield been disposed of intentionally, the handgrip and boss would have been recovered, and they propose that the shield may have been accidentally consumed by the fire.

== Exhibition ==
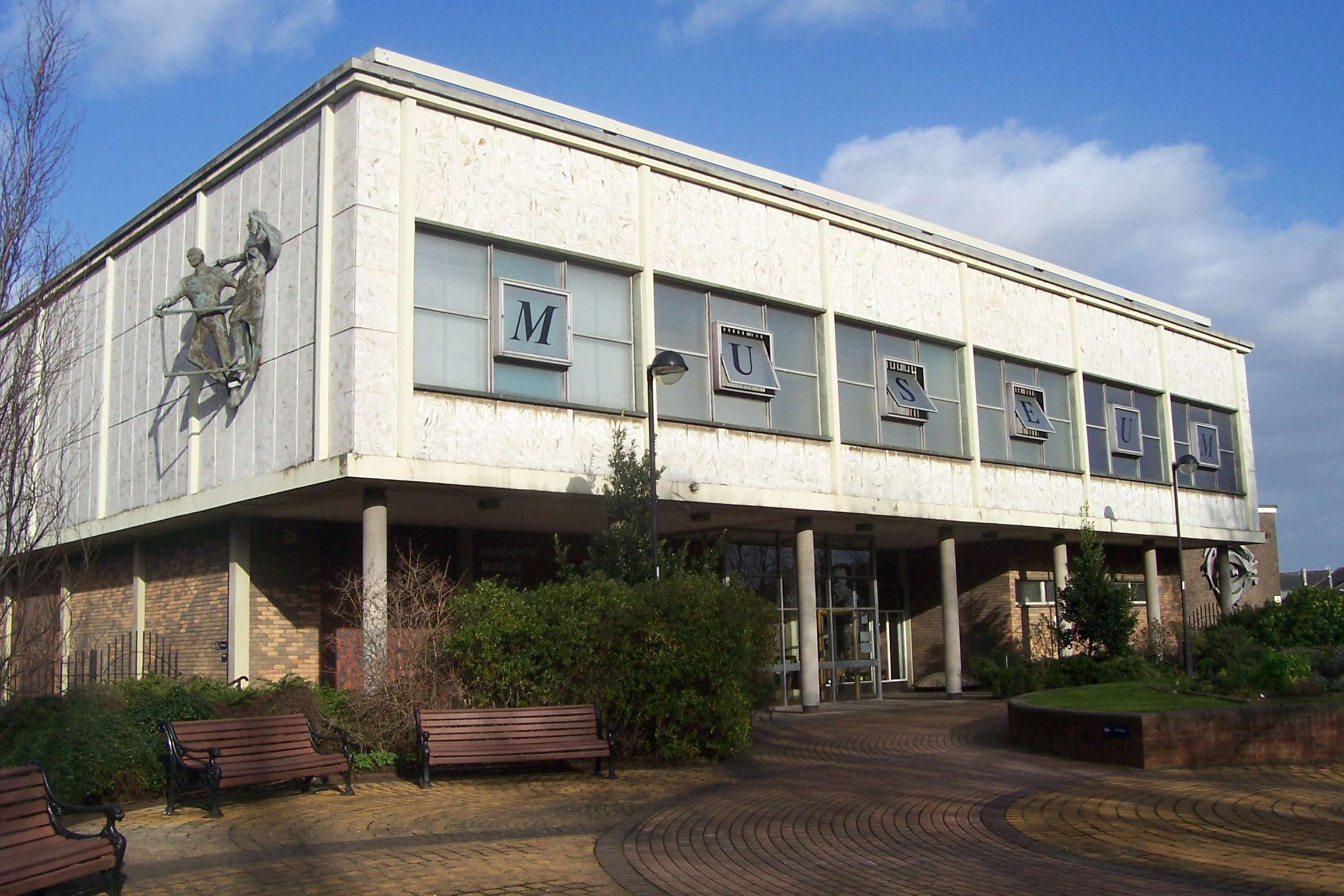
The Doncaster Museum which held the remains of the Danum shield until 2020

The boss and handgrip from the shield were preserved, along with some iron and bronze fragments, and have been on display at the Doncaster Museum and Art Gallery. Buckland made what he described as a "reasonably accurate overall reconstruction" of the shield in 1978 which has been displayed alongside it. The reconstruction draws inspiration from a shield depicted on the Triumphal Arch of Orange. The tabula ansata detail at the top of the bronzework decoration was based findings from the Roman camp at Vindonissa. The reconstruction weighs around 9 kilograms (20 lb) which is probably a little lighter than the original.

The remains were transferred to the Danum Gallery, Library and Museum in 2020.
