= Theseus International Management Institute =

Defunct French graduate business school

- Sophia Antipolis; France

Information
- Type: Graduate business school
- Established: 1989
- Closed: 2004 (merger with EDHEC Business School)

Theseus International Management Institute was a French graduate business school founded in 1989 that focussed on the high technology sector. In 2004, it merged into EDHEC Business School and was fully integrated by 2010.

== History ==
Theseus Institute was founded in 1989 in Sophia Antipolis, France. Sponsors included France Télécom, BNP Paribas, Société Générale, MIT Sloan School of Management, and Politecnico di Milano, among others. Thierry Zylberberg was its founding director and former NYU-Poly program director Mel Horwitch was professor and founding dean of management. Other founding faculty included Claudio Ciborra and Louis Pouzin. Ahmet Aykaç served as Director General from 1996 until the school's merger with EDHEC in 2004. Faculty were from academic institutions, including Harvard University, University of Cambridge, and Technion; corporations such as Apple Inc., HP Inc., Xerox and IBM; and consulting firms like Booz Allen Hamilton, and McKinsey & Company. The school was accredited by the Association of MBAs.

== Education ==
The school was an innovative experiment that triggered a series of similar MBA programs that focussed on integrating information technology into universities. Starting with its foundation in 1989, Theseus gave all students an Apple computer and an email address, which was the first email address for many. In 2002, a joint two-year MBA with the Center for International Business Education and Research at the UCLA Anderson School of Management began. Theseus also offered an executive MBA and was ranked #1 worldwide by the Financial Times's Survey of Business Schools in May 2003 for Internationality in Custom Executive Programs. Financial Times ranked them #35 on their 2003 Executive Education survey and in 2004 ranked the program #37 in Europe.
