= Coconstitutionalism =

Government form

Coconstitutionalism is where two institutional cultures exist in a complex semi-autonomous relationship to each other. The model of asymmetrical devolution that has emerged in democratic Spain has been called "coconstitutional" in that it is neither a federal nor a unitary model of government: autonomous nation-regions exist alongside and within the Spanish nation-state in a relatively dynamic relationship.

Similarities to federalism are marked although a key difference lies in the legal status of a federal-state versus a notionally unitary coconstitutional one: in a federation, it is the states who legally transfer powers to the federal government (bottom up) whereas in a unitary state power is devolved from the nation-state down to the regions (top down) and can in theory be revoked. Political conflict between Catalonia and Spain resulted in the 2017–2018 Spanish constitutional crisis.

Since 1997, the UK government has pursued a similar coconstitutional model of devolution with regard to its nation-regions.

Five regions in Italy, namely Aosta Valley, Friuli-Venezia Giulia, Sardinia, Sicily, and Trentino-Alto Adige/Südtirol, have special forms of autonomy.
