= Hai-Hsin Huang =

Brooklyn-based Taiwanese artist

Hai-Hsin Huang (黃海欣; born 1984) is a Brooklyn-based Taiwanese artist. She works primarily in painting, drawing, and with publications.

== Career ==
Huang received her BA degree from National Taipei University of Education in 2007 and an MFA from The School of Visual Arts in New York in 2009. Often employing humor and horror in her paintings, Huang explores the chaos to be found in everyday life scenes. She also uses her work to reflect on her cross-cultural experiences and encounters with racism as a foreigner living in the United States.

Her painting series A Museum Show (2016-2017), was formed by her time spent visiting museums in New York, particularly the Metropolitan Museum of Art, in search of inspiration and is inspired by her on observations of the tourists, school groups, and other museum-goers.

She has also collaborated on several artist book projects with the Taiwanese independent publishers nos:books, designing and publishing books together from 2014-2019.

== See also ==
- Taiwanese art
