= Danum Gallery, Library and Museum =

Military Museum in Doncaster, South Yorkshire, England

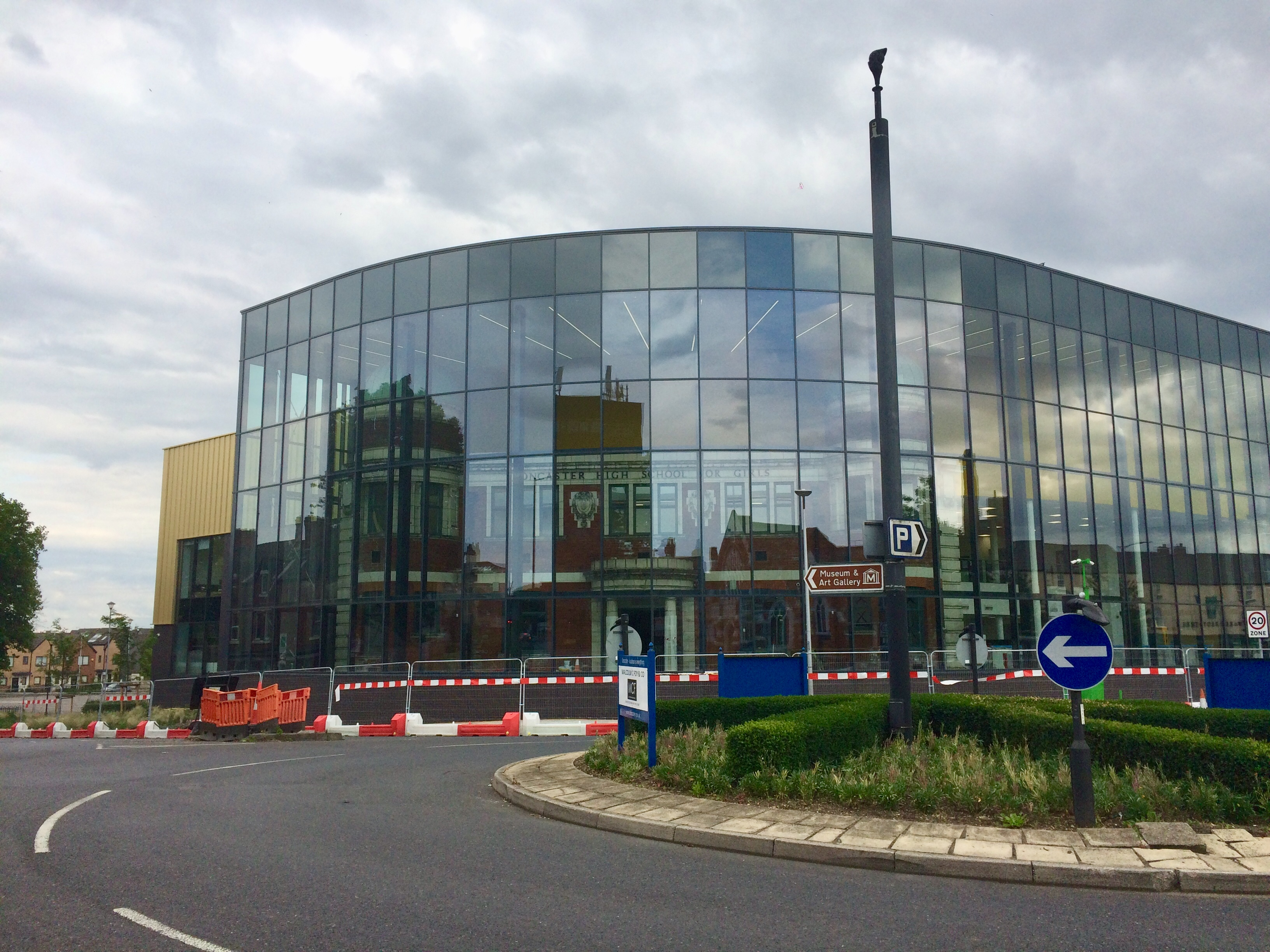
- The new museum, gallery and library under construction, now completed

- Location of the museum within South Yorkshire
- Established: 1964
- Location: Doncaster, South Yorkshire, England
- Coordinates: 53.5207°N 1.12740°W
- Type: Military Museum
- Website: www.dglam.org.uk

Danum Gallery, Library and Museum, formerly Doncaster Museum and Art Gallery is a multi-purpose cultural venue in Doncaster, South Yorkshire, England.

== History ==
The first Doncaster Museum opened in 1909 at Beechfield House, utilising only the ground floor of the building, and operated a small zoo at the site from 1955. It moved to a purpose-built site on Chequer Road in 1964 to display collections of natural history, archaeology, local history, fine and decorative art. The holotype of the extinct species Ichthyosaurus anningae was identified in the museum's collection in 2008 and formally named in 2015. The building also houses the Regimental Museum of the King's Own Yorkshire Light Infantry. The Roman Danum shield, found in Doncaster in 1971 is on display in the museum.

The museum won the "Most Improved Audience Figures" award from Audiences Yorkshire in 2009.

=== Redevelopment ===
The former museum site closed on 17 January 2020, with the move to a new venue, originally intended to open in summer 2020. The COVID-19 pandemic caused delays to the relocation process. The new building, which cost £14 million, was completed in October 2020. The new museum is called 'The Danum Gallery, Library and Museum' and encloses the Doncaster High School for Girls building. The new museum opened to the public on 29 May 2021.

A new rail heritage centre opened on 19 September 2021 within the venue exhibits the Great Northern Railway C1 class locomotive No. 251 and the London and North Eastern Railway Class V2 4771 locomotive Green Arrow to celebrate the contribution Doncaster made to the rail industry. Both locomotives were built in Doncaster and are on loan from the National Railway Museum for three years from February 2021.

The original site of the museum on Chequer Road is now home to the Doncaster Archives and Local Studies Library.
