= Kooshk Residency =

Kooshk Residency was founded in 2014, as a non-profit art and cultural space, providing artist-in-residence programs in downtown Tehran, Iran.

== Programs ==
Kooshk frequently takes part in international exchange programs, composed of two parts. The first part is a month-long residency held in Iran and the second part is in the selected artist-in-residence's country (or vice versa) with a gap of 2–6 months in between. Artists for this program apply through an open call and get selected by the decision of both residencies.

Kooshk residency has worked with many residencies such as Artistes en Residence (France), Organhaus Art Space (China), AIR Antwerpen (Belgium), Stiftelsen 3,14 (Norway), Irish Museum of Modern Art (Ireland), Bag Factory (South Africa), Pathshala (Bangladesh), Viafarini (Italy), Khoj (India), Chhaap Foundation (India), Y Residency (Greece), Arquetopia (Mexico) in exchange form.

Kooshk also works in partnership with local and international art Institutes and the cultural sections of foreign embassies in Tehran.

The other program is the Kooshk Artist Residency Award (KARA). An annual award granted to four artists from different countries which get selected by an international team of jury. All expenses including flight tickets, accommodation, living expenses as well as a modest contribution for materials will be paid by the Kooshk Residency.

Open calls and news about Kooshk programs is published on Kooshk's website, social networks, and international residency networks. Kooshk has two shared Rooms and one single room to accommodate five people at the same time. It also has a separate studio with round the clock accessibility.
