= Gasworks Gallery =

Gasworks
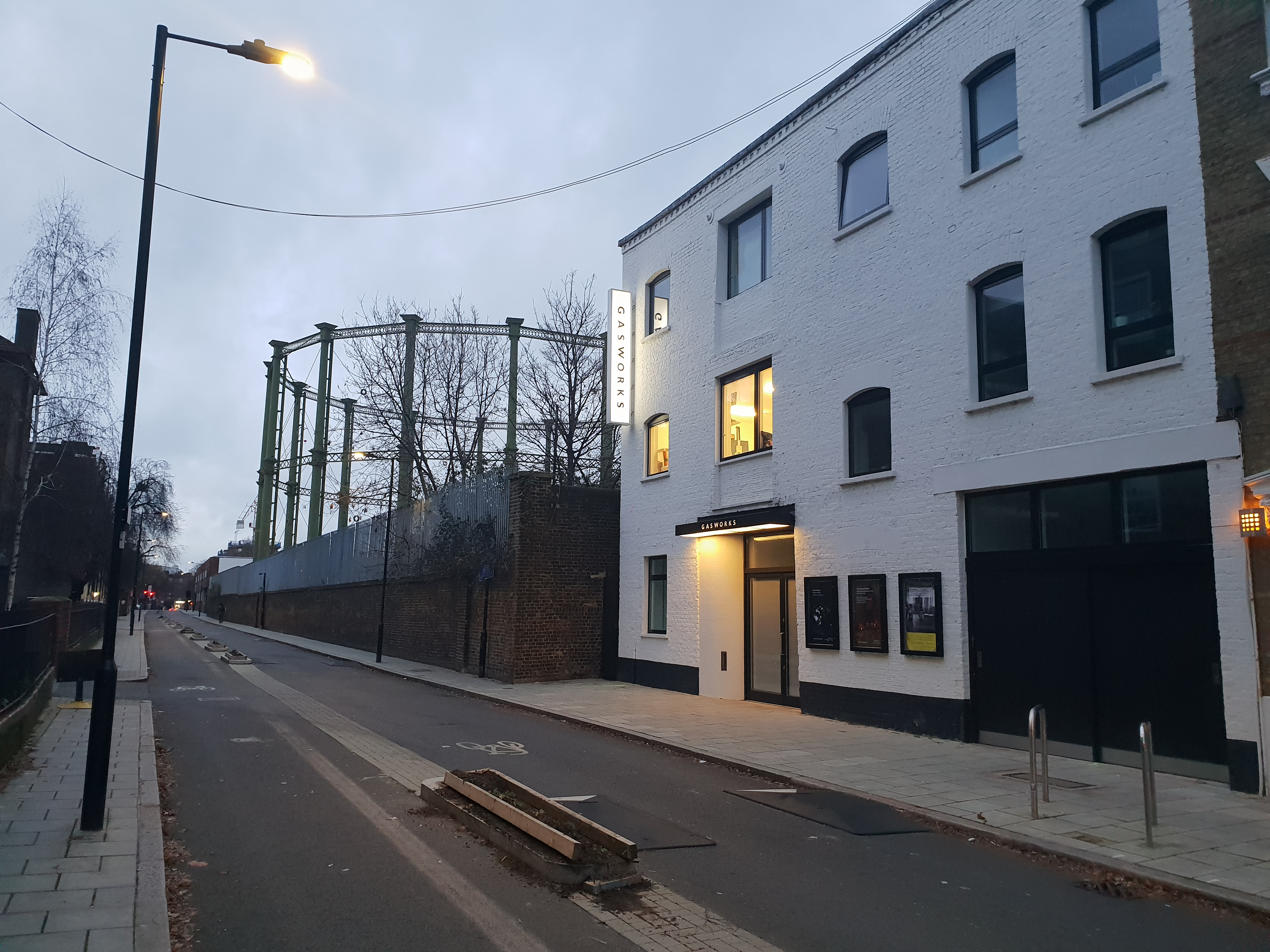
- Gasworks Gallery

- Location within Greater London
- Established: 1994
- Location: Kennington, London, SE11
- Coordinates: 51°29′6″N 0°6′57″W
- Type: Contemporary art gallery
- Director: Robert Leckie
- Curator: Rosa Tyhurst
- Public transit access: Vauxhall station, Oval station
- Website: www.gasworks.org.uk

Gasworks is a contemporary art organisation based near The Oval cricket ground in Kennington, South East London, which comprises a gallery and 13 artist studios as well offering residencies, international fellowships and educational projects.

== Artist residency ==
The gallery is part of The Triangle Network, an international network or residencies and workshops offering artists the opportunity develop their practice stimulated by a climate of international exchange and dialogue.

Some studios are rented to London-based artists and some are reserved for an International Residency Programme for non-UK based artists. Gasworks residencies encourage exchange of ideas between practitioners, instigating experimentation with new concepts and new materials. Since 1994, Gasworks Residency Programme has worked with artists from countries worldwide, with Chris Ofili, Yinka Shonibare, Song Dong and Lynette Yiadom-Boakye among its alumni.

Gasworks residencies include an education and outreach programme, with some residencies dedicated to working with local community groups. Residencies culminate in Open Studios with occasional projects developed in collaboration with the exhibition programme.

== Exhibitions ==
Gasworks hosts up to four exhibitions a year and profiles emerging or mid-career international or UK artists who have limited previous exposure in London. The exhibitions are complemented by a programme of education and off-site activities.

== Directors ==
- 2005–2023: Alessio Antoniolli
- 2024–: Robert Leckie
