= National Taipei University of Education =

University in Daan District, Taipei, Taiwan

National Taipei University of Education 國立臺北教育大學
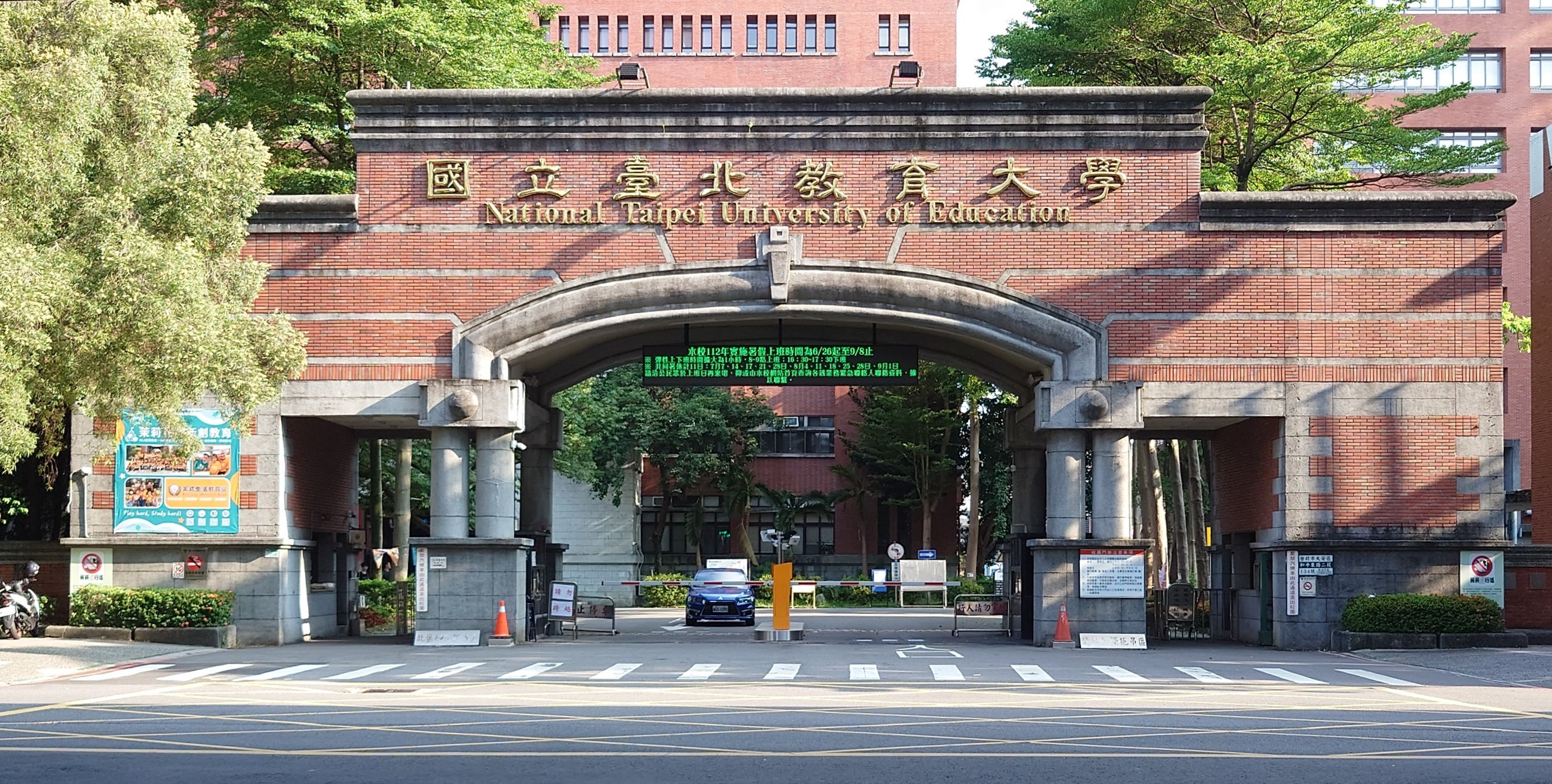
- Motto: 敦愛篤行
- Motto in English: To love and to act
- Established: 1895
- Location: Daan, Taipei, Taiwan; 25.0253°N 121.5409°E
- Website: www.ntue.edu.tw

Chinese name
- Traditional Chinese: 國立臺北教育大學
- Simplified Chinese: 国立台北教育大学
Transcriptions
Standard Mandarin
- Hanyu Pinyin: Guólì Táiběi Jiàoyù Dàxué

National Taipei University of Education (NTUE; Chinese: 國立臺北教育大學) is a university located in Daan District, Taipei, Taiwan that predominantly focuses on teacher training. It was established in 1895, at the beginning of the Japanese colonial rule of Taiwan, as the Governor-General's Taihoku Teacher's College.

== History ==
NTUE was originally established in 1896 as Zhishanyan School (芝山巖學堂) soon after Japan started to rule Taiwan. It changed a year later in 1897 to Taihoku Normal School (臺北師範學校). In December 1945, right after the handover of Taiwan from Japan to China, the school was renamed to Taiwan Provincial Normal School (臺灣省立臺北師範學校). After that, the school underwent several name changes: namely, Taiwan Provincial Junior Teachers’ College in 1961, Taiwan Provincial Taipei Normal College in 1987, National Taipei Teachers’ College in 1991, and finally National Taipei University of Education in 2005.

== Academics ==
NTUE is organized into three colleges: Education, Humanities and Arts, and Science.

National Taipei University of Education rankings

Regional – Overall
- QS Asia: 701-750 (2025)

== Transportation ==
The university is accessible within walking distance south from the Technology Building Station of the Taipei Metro.

== Notable alumni ==
- Chang Hung-lu, politician and member of Legislative Yuan
- Chuang Chi-fa, historian
- Huang Yu-cheng, Minister of the Hakka Affairs Council (2008-2014)
- Hai-Hsin Huang, artist

== See also ==
- List of universities in Taiwan
