= Jannis Kallinikos =

Greek-born academic

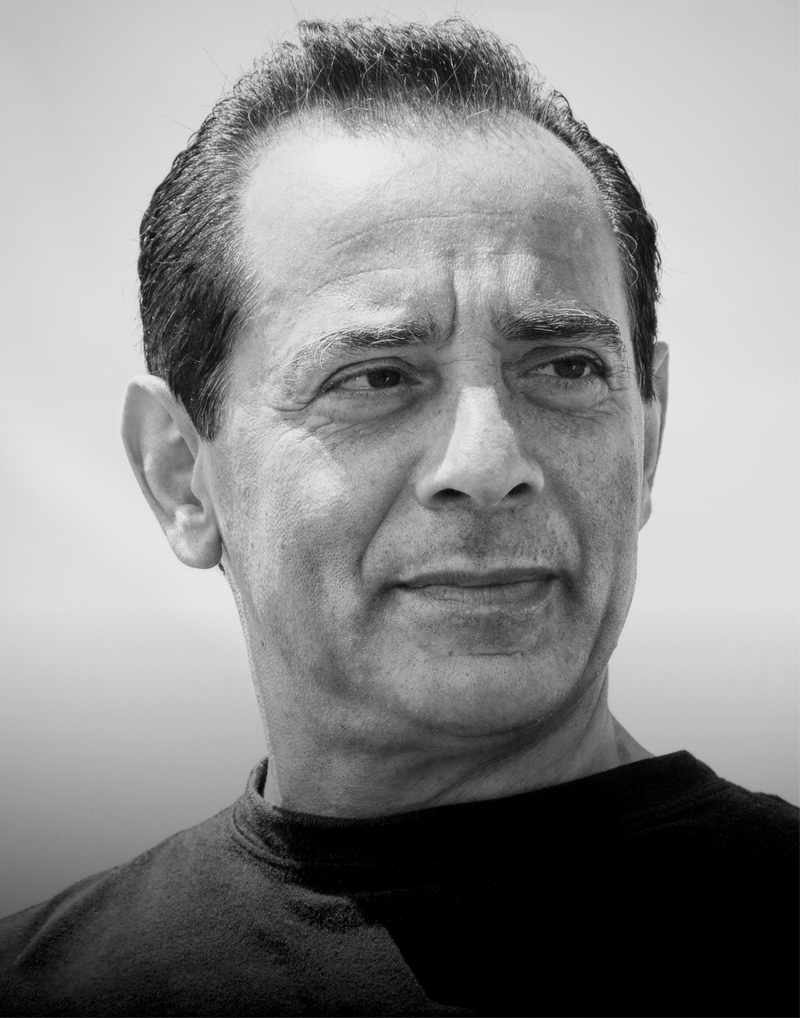
- Jannis Kallinikos photographed for Mercury Magazine
- Born: Jannis Kallinikos; June 19, 1954 (age 72); Preveza, Greece
- Citizenship: Greek, Swedish
- Education: Uppsala University
- Occupations: informatics, information science, information technology, organization theory
- Years active: 1985–

Jannis Kallinikos (Greek: Ιωάννης Καλλίνικος; b. 1954) is a Greek organization and communication scholar and intellectual. He was born in the town of Preveza, western Greece. He is also a citizen of Sweden. Kallinikos is currently a professor in the Information Systems and Innovation Group, Department of Management at the London School of Economics and Political Science (LSE). His scholarly projects have over the years covered several themes ranging from the significance writing and notation has assumed in the making of modern organizations through the understanding of markets as semiotic systems to the study of bureaucracy and institutions. His concerns have recently shifted to the investigation of the conditions associated with the penetration of the social and economic fabric by technological information. Kallinikos calls this emerging socio-economic environment, marked by the ubiquitous presence of the Internet, information-based services and software-mediated culture, the habitat of information. The term indicates that the growing involvement of information in society, economy and culture is associated with important changes in the ways institutions operate as well as shifts in behavioural, cognitive and communicative habits.

== Education ==
Kallinikos completed his undergraduate studies in the Athens University of Economics and Business in 1977 and moved to Sweden for postgraduate studies at the Department of Business Studies at Uppsala University. After completing his MSc in 1979 Kallinikos pursued doctoral studies and was awarded his PhD in 1985 from the same department.

== Academic career ==
In 2001, Kallinikos joined the Department of Information Systems at LSE when Claudio Ciborra was in charge of it. The department merged in 2006 with three other departments into a newly founded Department of Management. Kallinikos has been a visiting professor at various universities, including the University of Bologna, Uppsala University, Växjö University, Umeå University, University of Macedonia, Greece, Stanford University and the European Institute of Advanced Studies in Brussels. LSE promoted him to full professor in 2007. Kallinikos served as member of the LSE Research Committee (2003–2008) research chair of the Information systems and Innovation group (2005–2008) and director of the MSc Programme in Information Systems and Organizations Research (ISOR) (2006–2008).

== Research area ==
Kallinikos's research comprises the study of formal organizations with specific emphasis on the range of objectified techniques and methods by which organizations are constructed as particular social entities and rendered predictable and durable. The study of information, information technology and information systems forms part of that intellectual project. According to Kallinikos, the proliferation of digital means of information processing and transmission, and the growing involvement of the Internet in social life are altering the socio-economic environment in which organizations and institutions are embedded.

Over the last years Kallinikos has worked on the idea of the information habitat to capture how increasingly abstract and disembedded data processing and calculation restructure organizations and institutions. He sees information technologies as electronic successors to writing, notation and paper-based means of dealing with information. In this new setting underpinned to a great extent by the internet, information is increasingly generated out of existing information through a variety of automated and autonomic procedures afforded by interconnected information systems and computer technology. In order to study the habitat of information, Kallinikos has formed The Information Growth And Internet Research Group (TIGAIR).

In his recent research, he further elaborated on his framework of Information Growth and Information Habitat by focusing on the ephemeral and amorphous nature of digital objects (e.g. software applications, hypertext documents, computer games, etc.) which differ from material, physical objects in non-trivial ways. At the core of his Theory of Digital Objects lies the argument that digital objects are to be seen as computational operations. Digital objects are objects only in a euphemistic sense. With this argument, Kallinikos has become a strong advocate for a small but growing community of social scientists, such as Jochen Runde and Philip Faulkner from the University of Cambridge, UK, or Paul Leonardi from Northwestern University, Illinois) who share a common interest in the research on ICT enabled, digital and immaterial objects and their ontological modes of existence in various institutional fields and organizations.

Kallinikos's overall outlook is constructivist in the sense of focusing on the semiotic and communicative means by which social reality is fashioned and made durable. However, drawing upon scholars such as Shoshana Zuboff, Nelson Goodman, Niklas Luhmann and Albert Borgmann, Kallinikos has sought to distance himself from popular constructivist approaches and their focus on local settings. He has claimed in several of his works that information and communication technologies mediate a coherent set of principles for framing and acting upon reality. The social and behavioural implications of such principles transcend the human-technology interface and cannot be sufficiently studied as an instance of local adaptation and interpretation of technological systems and artifacts by willful agents.

== Selected publications ==
Kallinikos has published numerous monographs, peer-reviewed articles, book chapters, reviews, and edited several books. A representative picture of Kallinikos's thinking can be found in:

- Governing Through Technology. Information Artefacts and Social Practice, Palgrave Macmillan. 2010.
- The Consequences Of Information: Institutional Implications of Technological Change. Edward Elgar. 2006.

Other key publications include:

- (with Aaltonen, A. and Marton, A.) A Theory of Digital Objects. First Monday 15(6), 2010.
- On the Computational Rendition of Reality: Artefacts and Human Agency, Organization, 16/2: 183–202, 2009.
- (with Nardi, B.) Human-Computer Interaction. In Donsbach, W. (ed.): International Encyclopedia of Communication and ICT. Blackwell. 2008.
- Information Technology, Contingency and Risk. In Hanseth, O. and Ciborra, C. (eds): Risk, Complexity and ICT. Edward Elgar. 2007.
- The Order of Technology: Complexity and Control in a Connected World. Information and Organization 15(3):185–202. 2005
- Farewell to Constructivism: Technology and Context-Embedded Action. In Avgerou et al. (eds): The Social Study of Information and Communication Technology. Oxford University Press. 2004.
- Deconstructing Information Packages: Organizational and Behavioural Implications of ERP Systems. Information Technology and People 17(1): 8–30. 2004.
- The Social Foundations of the Bureaucratic Order. Organization, 11/1: 13–36, 2004.
- (with Hasselbladh, H.) The Project of Rationalization: A Critique and Reappraisal of Institutionalism in Organization Studies. Organization Studies, 21/4: 697–720., 2000.
- Technology and Society: Interdisciplinary Studies in Formal Organization. ACCEDO. 1996.
- Cognitive Foundations of Economic Institutions: Markets, Organizations and Networks Revisited, Scandinavian Journal of Management, 11/2: 119–137.
- (with José-Carlos Mariátegui) Video as digital object: production and distribution of video content in the internet media ecosystem. The information society, 27 (5).
