= Lucas Introna =

Lucas D. Introna
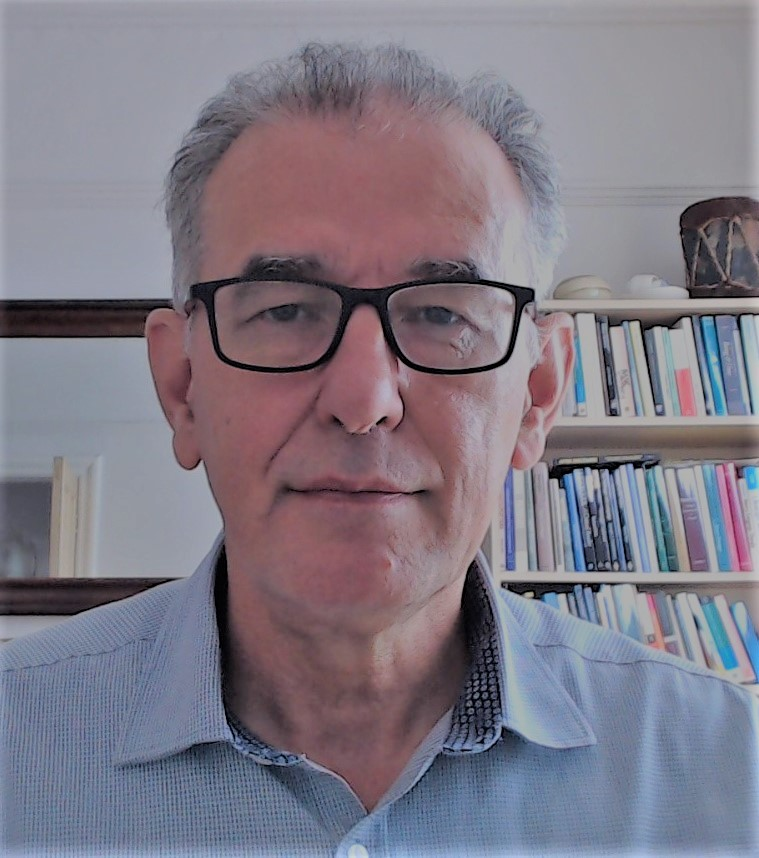
- Born: Lucas Daniel Introna; September 27, 1961 (age 65)
- Citizenship: British, Italian

Lucas D. Introna (born 1961) is Professor of Organisation, Technology and Ethics at the Lancaster University Management School. He is a scholar within the Social Study of Information Systems field. His research is focused on the phenomenon of technology. Within the area of technology studies he has made significant contributions to our understanding of the ethical and political implications of technology for society.

== Work ==
Early on in his career Introna was concerned with the way managers incorporated information in support of managerial practices (such as planning, decision-making, etc.). In this work he provided an account of the manager as an always already involved and entangled actor (which is always to a greater or lesser extent already compromised and configured) in contrast to the traditional normative model of the manager as a rational objective free agent that can choose to act or not act in particular ways. Later on his work shifted to a more critical appraisal of technology itself. He, together with co-workers, published a number of critical evaluations of information technology including search engines web search engines, ATMs, facial recognition systems facial recognition systems, etc. His recent work focuses on the ethical and political aspects of technology as well as making contribution to a field that has become known as sociomateriality.

=== Management, Information and Power ===
In his book Management, Information and Power, Introna argued that most management education is normatively based (i.e. telling managers how they ought to act), yet managers' organisational reality is mostly based on the ongoing play of power and politics, as has been shown by Henry Mintzberg (See also his recent book Managing). Thus, instead of using information to inform rationality (as the traditional normative models assume) information is rather most often deployed as a resource in organisational politics. This fact, Introna argues, requires an understanding of the relationship between information and power (as suggested in the work of Michel Foucault) rather than information and rationality, as traditionally assumed in the mainstream management literature.

=== Phenomenological and technology ===
Drawing on phenomenology, especially the work of Martin Heidegger and Don Ihde, Introna together with Fernando Ilharco developed a phenomenological analysis of information technology—in particular a detailed account of the phenomenology of the screen. They argue that in the phenomenon screen, seeing is not merely being aware of a surface. The very watching of the screen, as a screen, implies that the screen has already soaked up our attention. In screening, screens already attract and hold our attention. They continue to hold our attention as they present what is supposedly relevant—this is exactly why they have the power to attract and hold our attention. This ongoing relevance has as its necessary condition an implicit agreement, not of content, but of a way of living and a way of doing—or rather a certain agreement about the possibilities of truth. As such they argue that screens are ontological entities.

=== The ethics and politics of technology ===
Introna (with a variety of co-workers) has developed a variety of detailed empirical studies of the ethics and politics of technology—within the tradition of Science and technology studies. For example, with Helen Nissenbaum he published a paper on the politics of web search engines. This research showed that the indexing and ranking algorithms of Google are producing a particular version of the internet. One which systematically exclude (in some cases by design and in some, accidentally) certain sites and certain types of sites in favour of others, systematically giving prominence to some at the expense of others. Introna also published similar political and ethical studies on Facial recognition systems, Automatic teller machines, and plagiarism detection Systems, amongst others.

=== Sociomateriality and the ethics of things ===
More recently Introna has suggested that if we are cyborgs, as argued by Donna Haraway and others, then our ethical relationships with the inanimate material world needs to be reconsidered in a fundamental way. According to him this can only be achieved if we humans abandon a human centric ethical framework and opt for an ethical framework in which all beings are considered worthy of ethical consideration.

== Selected publications ==
- 2023. Being-in-the-Screen: Phenomenological Reflections on Contemporary Screenhood, in Robson, G.J., & Tsou, J.Y. (eds). Technology Ethics: A Philosophical Introduction and Readings (1st ed.). Routledge. https://doi.org/10.4324/9781003189466
- 2021. “Touching Tactfully: The Impossible Community”, in Olsen, B., Burström, M., DeSilvey, C. and Pétursdóttir, Þ. (Eds.), After Discourse: Things, Affects, Ethics, 1st edition., Routledge, London & New York, pp. 207–218.
- 2019. Performativity and sociomaterial becoming: what technologies do? In S. Webb (Editor), The Routledge Handbook of Critical Social Work. Oxford ; New York: Routledge, 312-323
- 2017. On the making of sense in sensemaking: decentred sensemaking in the meshwork of life, Organization Studies, https://doi.org/10.1177/0170840618765579.
- 2016. Algorithms, Governance and Governmentality: On governing academic writing, Science, Technology and Human Values, 41(1):17-49
- 2014. Ethics and Flesh: Being touched by the otherness of things, In Olsen, Bjørnar and Þóra Pétursdóttir (eds.), Ruin Memories: Materialities, Aesthetics and the Archaeology of the Recent Past, Oxford: Routledge, p. 41-61. [ISBN 9781317695790]
- 2013. Afterword: Performativity and the becoming of sociomaterial assemblages. In de Vaujany, F-X., & Mitev, N. (Eds.), Materiality and Space: Organizations, Artefacts and Practices.(pp. 330–342).Palgrave Macmillan.
- 2013. Otherness and the letting-be of becoming: or, ethics beyond bifurcation. In Carlile, P., Nicolini, D., Langley, A., & Tsoukas, H. (Eds.), How matter matters. (pp. 260–287). Oxford: Oxford University Press.
- 2011. The Enframing of Code: Agency, originality and the plagiarist, Theory, Culture and Society, 28(6): 113-141.
- 2009. Ethics and the speaking of things, Theory, Culture and Society, 26(4): 398-419.
- 2008. Phenomenology, Organisation and Technology, Universidade Católica Editora, Lisbon. (with Fernando Ilharco and Eric Faÿ)
- 2007. Maintaining the Reversibility of Foldings: Making the ethics (politics) of information technology visible, Ethics and Information Technology, 9(1): 11-25
- 2006. The Meaning of Screens: Towards a phenomenological account of screenness, Human Studies, 29(1): 57-76. (with Fernando M. Ilharco)
- 2005. Disclosing the Digital Face: The ethics of facial recognition systems, Ethics and Information Technology, 7(2): 75-86
- 2002. The (im)possibility of ethics in the information age. Information and Organisation, 12(2):71-84.
- 2000. Shaping the Web: Why the politics of search engines matters, The Information Society, 16(3):169-185 (with Helen Nissenbaum )
- 1999. Privacy in the Information Age: Stakeholders, interests and values. Journal of Business Ethics, 22(1): 27-38 (with Nancy Poloudi)
- 1997. Privacy and the Computer: Why we Need Privacy in the Information Society. Metaphilosophy, 28(3): 259-275
- 1997. Management, Information and Power: A narrative of the involved manager, Macmillan, Basingstoke.
