= Triangle Arts Trust =

International arts organisation

The Triangle Network, formally known as the Triangle Arts Trust, is an international arts organisation that brings together artists from different countries to explore new ideas and expand the boundaries of their practice.

== History ==
The Triangle Network was established in 1982 by British businessman Robert Loder and sculptor Anthony Caro. It was initiated through a series of artists' workshops providing an uninterrupted period of two weeks where 20–25 artists from diverse cultural backgrounds engage with each other, to explore new ideas and expand the boundaries of their practice.

David Elliott was appointed to chair the board, succeeding Robert Loder who retired in 2009. Loder remained a trustee of the organization until 2012.

== Description ==
The Triangle Network is organised as a network of artists, visual art organisations, and artists-led workshops. It currently is active in over 30 countries. Each centre within the Network is independent and set up to respond to local needs. The object of the workshops is "to counterbalance the tendency of the Western art world to put the emphasis on the object and its marketing rather than on the creative process itself".

It coalesces grassroots arts organisations around the world (many of which were initiated as workshops while others grew independently), so that artists' mobility, international cultural exchange and capacity building objectives can be shared.

The Triangle Network is registered as a charitable organisation in the UK as the Triangle Arts Trust.

== Associated organisations and workshops ==
=== Europe ===
- Braziers workshop, UK
- The Cornelius Arts Foundation, France
- Cyfuniad workshop, UK
- Gasworks Gallery, UK
- HANGAR, Portugal
- Pamoja workshop, UK
- Shave workshop, UK
- Northings, Tanera Mor, Scotland
- Triangle Barcelona workshop, Spain
- Triangle France, France

=== Middle East ===
- Al Mahatta, Palestine
- Batroun Projects, Lebanon
- Wasla Workshop, Egypt
- Open Studio Project Cairo, Egypt
- Rybon Art Center, Tehran, Iran

=== Africa ===
- 32° East, Uganda
- ABRO International Workshop, Addis Ababa, Ethiopia
- Aftershave workshop, Nigeria
- Bag Factory, Johannesburg
- Batapata workshop, Zimbabwe
- Greatmore Studios, Cape Town
- Kuona Trust & Wasanii workshop, Kenya
- Mbile/Insaka workshops, Zambia
- Ngoma workshop, Uganda
- Njelele, Zimbabwe
- Pachipamwe workshop, Zimbabwe
- Partage, Mauritius
- Rafiki workshop, Tanzania
- Rockston Studios, Zambia
- Tenq workshop, Senegal
- Thapong workshop, Botswana
- Thupelo workshop, Cape Town and Johannesburg
- Tulipamwe workshop, Namibia
- Ujamaa workshop, Mozambique

=== Asia and Australia ===
- 112A residency, China
- Britto Arts Trust, Bangladesh
- Burragorang workshop, Australia
- Cona Foundation, India
- Flats workshop, Australia
- Hong Kong International Artists' Workshop
- KHOJ, India
- Kimberley workshop, Australia
- Lijiang workshop, China
- No.1 Shanthi Road, India
- Organhaus, China
- Sutra workshop & residency, Nepal
- Theertha, Sri Lanka
- Upriver Loft residency, China
- Vasl workshop & residency, Pakistan
- Village workshop, Rajasthan

=== United States ===
- Triangle NYC, New York City

=== Caribbean ===
- CCA (Caribbean Contemporary Arts), Trinidad
- Big River workshop, Trinidad
- Madinina workshop, Martinique
- Proyecto Batiscafo, Cuba
- Soroa workshop, Cuba
- Watamula workshop, Curaçao
- Xayamaca workshop, Jamaica

=== South America ===
- Capacete, Brazil
- El Basilisco, Argentina
- Festival de Performance, Cali, Colombia
- Helena Producciones, Colombia
- Kiosko/Simple, Bolivia
- Km0 (kilometro zero), Bolivia
- La Llama, Venezuela
- Lugar a Dudas, Colombia
- PIVÔ, Brazil
- URRA, Argentina
