= Rob Kling =

American information theorist

- Born: August 1944; Elizabeth, New Jersey, U.S.
- Died: May 15, 2003 (aged 58); Bloomington, Indiana, U.S.
- Title: Professor
- Spouse: Mitzi Lewison

Academic background
- Education: Columbia University (BS); Stanford University (MS); Stanford University (PhD)

Academic work
- Discipline: Computer science
- Sub-discipline: Social informatics

Rob Kling (August 1944 – May 15, 2003) was an American professor of information systems and information science at the School of Library and Information Science (SLIS) and adjunct professor of computer science at Indiana University Bloomington in the United States. He directed the interdisciplinary Center for Social Informatics (CSI), at Indiana University. Previously, he taught at the University of Wisconsin–Madison from 1971 to 1973, and then at the University of California, Irvine for 23 years before starting at Indiana University in 1996.

He is considered to have been a key founder of social analyses of computing and a leading expert on the study of social informatics; he was described by the Los Angeles Times as "the founding father of social informatics". He served on the boards of several academic journals and was an editor for The Information Society. His research was published in at least 85 academic journal articles and book chapters; he consulted for the United States Congress and spoke at conferences across North America and western Europe. Kling was awarded an honorary doctorate in social sciences by the Free University of Brussels in 1987.

Kling was born in Elizabeth, New Jersey, U.S. He earned a bachelor's degree from Columbia University before obtaining a master's degree and doctoral degree in artificial intelligence from Stanford University; he worked as a research engineer for the Stanford Research Institute's Artificial Intelligence Center. He died on May 15, 2003 in Bloomington, Indiana of cardiovascular disease at age 58. The Rob Kling Center for Social Informatics of the Luddy School of Informatics, Computing, and Engineering at Indiana University Bloomington is named in his honor.
