= List of information systems journals =

The following is a list of information systems journals, containing academic journals that cover information systems. The list given here contains the most influential, currently publishing journals in the field.

To understand which are the best journals for a particular Information Systems (IS) field of study, one needs to understand that IS is a multidisciplinary research area and that the "IS discipline draws on the social science as well as the engineering research traditions. The social science tradition is represented by the economics-based and behavioral research, whereas the engineering tradition is epitomized by the design science approach in IS research."

== Top management information systems journals ==
The following journals were selected by the Association for Information Systems Senior Scholars as part of the Senior Scholars’ List of Premier Journals. The journals in the list are, in alphabetical order:

- Decision Support Systems
- European Journal of Information Systems
- Information & Management
- Information and Organization
- Information Systems Journal
- Information Systems Research
- Journal of the Association for Information Systems
- Journal of Information Technology
- Journal of Management Information Systems
- Journal of Strategic Information Systems
- MIS Quarterly

== Management journals that publish information systems research ==
- Electronic Markets
- Management Science
- Organization Science

== Top information systems journals with an engineering tradition, epitomized by the design science approach ==
- AIS Transactions on Human-Computer Interaction
- Business & Information Systems Engineering
- Information Systems
