= Yolande E. Chan =

Information systems professor

- Born: Yolande E. Brown; Kingston, Jamaica
- Education: Massachusetts Institute of Technology (BS); Hertford College, Oxford (MPhil); University of Western Ontario (PhD)
- Occupations: Dean and James McGill Professor, Desautels Faculty of Management at McGill University
- Spouse: Michael P. Chan (married 1983-present)
- Children: 2
- Mother: Phyllis Brown

Yolande E. Chan is a Jamaican-Canadian information systems professor and education administrator. Chan joined the Desautels Faculty of Management at McGill University as Dean and James McGill Professor in August 2021. Her research focuses on innovation, knowledge strategy, digital strategy, and business-IT alignment. Chan has long been a champion for women and under-represented groups in academia. In her role as Dean of the Desautels Faculty of Management, she has made equity, diversity and inclusion a major strategic priority.

== Early life and education ==
Chan was born in Kingston, Jamaica to parents Phyllis and George Brown. At age 18, she left Jamaica to attend the Massachusetts Institute of Technology where she completed her Bachelor of Science in Electrical Engineering and in her final undergraduate year completed her Master of Science in Electrical Engineering and Computer Science.

She went on to attend Oxford University as a Rhodes Scholar, where she obtained her Master of Philosophy in Management Studies. In doing so, she became both the first female student and the first black student from MIT to be a Rhodes Scholar. In 1992, she earned a PhD in Business Administration (MIS) from Ivey Business School, at Western University.

== Career ==
Dr. Chan has served as Associate Dean of Research, PhD and MSc Programs, and the E. Marie Shantz Chair of Digital Technology at Smith School of Business at Queen's University prior to joining the Desautels Faculty of Management. She previously served as Associate Vice-Principal (Research) at Queen's University. Before joining academia, she worked with Andersen Consulting (now Accenture).

Her work has been published in academic journals, including MIS Quarterly, Information Systems Research, Journal of Management Information Systems, Journal of Strategic Information Systems, Journal of the Association for Information Systems, Information Systems Journal, Journal of Information Technology and European Journal of Information Systems. In 2022, she was appointed by Innovation, Science and Economic Development Canada (ISED) to the Government of Canada's Advisory Panel on the Federal Research Support System. She is the editor-in-chief of Journal of Strategic Information Systems. In December 2023, she was awarded the LEO prize, the highest honor given to scholars by the Association for Information Systems.
