= Bruce Dehning =

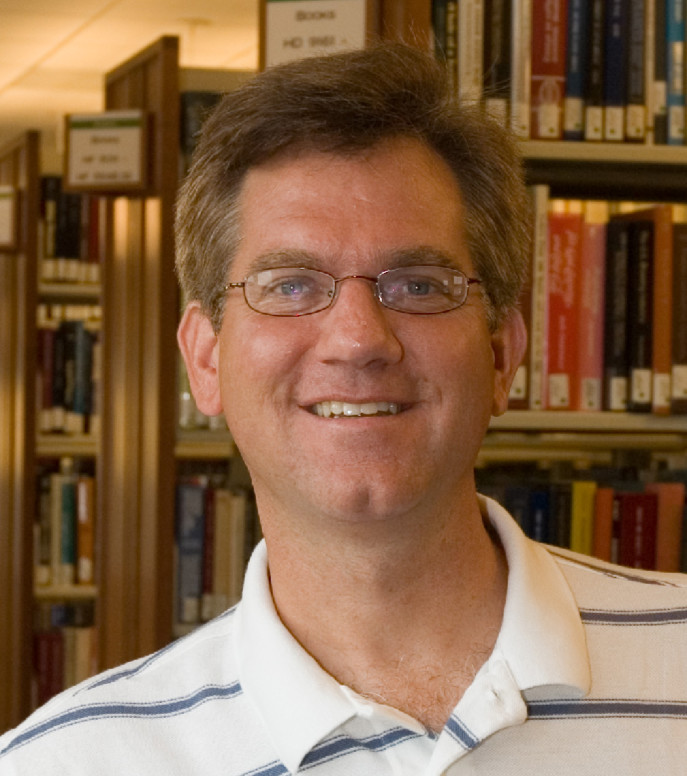
- Born: Bruce Dehning; Longmont, Colorado, United States
- Education: PhD, University of Colorado
- Occupations: Associate Professor, Argyros School of Business and Economics
- Employer: Chapman University
- Title: Associate Professor of Accounting Information Systems
- Awards: Fulbright Senior Scholar Grant, Wang–Fradkin Professorship, Virginia Paul Dee Professorship, American Accounting Association Information Systems Section Notable Contributions to the Literature Award, Alpha Kappa Psi Faculty Member of the Year, Alpha Kappa Psi Outstanding Faculty Mentor, American Accounting Association Information Systems Section Outstanding Service Award, Commemorative Medal for merits towards the development of the Faculty of Management and Economics of Tomas Bata University in Zlín, Czech Republic on the occasion of the 15th anniversary of its foundation, 2010.
- Website: www.brucedehning.com

Bruce Dehning is an American professor and scholar who spent almost his entire career in the collegiate realm. He is known primarily for his work researching the effect of information technology (IT) on firm performance for which he is a two-time winner of the Notable Contribution to the Accounting Information Systems Literature award (with Vernon J. Richardson in 2006, and with Vernon J. Richardson and Robert W. Zmud in 2013. He has thirty two total refereed publications, including three premier publications, ten top tier publications, and thirteen impact factor publications. His published work has been cited more than 3,600 times, making him one of the top ten most cited Accounting Information Systems researchers in the world.

Dehning began his career at the University of New Hampshire, where he was awarded the Virginia Paul Dee Professorship in 2001 before moving to Chapman University in 2002. At Chapman he was awarded the university's highest award for scholarly activity, the Wang–Fradkin Professorship in 2004. He received a Fulbright Senior Scholar Grant and spent six months in the Czech Republic in 2005. In the Czech Republic he taught at Tomas Bata University in Zlín, Czech Republic, and the Institute of Finance and Administration in Prague. After returning from the Czech Republic he was promoted to associate professor with tenure. In 2007 he was elected faculty chair in the Chapman University, Argyros School of Business and Economics, and served as associate dean 2008-2011, and spring semester 2017.

Dehning’s service to the profession includes the presidency of the American Accounting Association Information Systems Section in 2007–2008, as an editor of the Journal of Information Systems in 2014-2015, and as an associate editor of the International Journal of Accounting Information Systems in 2007–2010. In addition he serves on the Editorial Board of the Journal of Information Systems and the Editorial Board of the ASERC Journal of Socio-Economic Studies.

== Biography ==
Born in Longmont, Colorado, Dehning moved to Boulder, Colorado in 1983 where he attended the University of Colorado. He was first admitted to CU's engineering school, but eventually graduated with a Bachelor of Science in finance. After graduating from CU Dehning went to work for State Farm Insurance as a claims adjuster before returning to school to pursue a Master of Science in accounting. During graduate school Dehning worked as an accounting information systems consultant for small businesses, and as an assistant hall director in CU’s Arnett and Smith dormitories.

After finishing his master's degree Dehning stayed at CU to pursue a PhD in accounting, working primarily with Marlys and Bob Lipe. His dissertation was a behavioral finance experiment titled, "Prospect Theory as an Explanation for the Observed Characteristics of the Returns–Earnings Relation". His dissertation committee consisted of: Marlys Lipe, chair, Robert Lipe, Barry Lewis, and Gary McClelland of the University of Colorado, and Donald Moser of the University of Pittsburgh.

After graduation Dehning took an assistant professor position at the University of New Hampshire in 1998, after completing one year there ABD as an instructor. At UNH Dehning met an economist and management information systems (MIS) scholar, Theophanis Stratopoulos, who changed Dehning’s career by introducing him to MIS issues closely related to accounting and accounting information systems. Dehning and Stratopoulos collaborated on eight refereed publications and numerous national and international conference presentations and proceedings. It was at one of these conferences that Dehning met Vernon J. Richardson, now of the University of Arkansas, who introduced Dehning to Robert W. Zmud of the University of Oklahoma. Together Dehning, Richardson, and Zmud published two articles in the premier journals MIS Quarterly and the Journal of Operations Management. Dehning and Richardson also have several other top-tier publications together and with other collaborators.

Dehning left UNH for Chapman University in 2002 in order to further his possibilities for outstanding scholarly activity. Soon after arriving at Chapman, Dehning began a publication streak of 13 articles in four years, leading to him receiving the Wang–Fradkin Professorship at Chapman University in 2004. Dehning took a leave from Chapman in 2005 to spend six months in the Czech Republic teaching and doing research at Tomas Bata University in Zlín, and teaching at the Institute of Finance and Administration in Prague. While teaching at the Institute of Finance and Administration in Prague, Dehning met Dr. Alan Kraustengl, who later went on to become president of Anglo American University in Prague. This relationship led to the establishment of Chapman University’s Prague campus where currently the school offers its highly regarded MBA program.

== Publications ==
“Income and Life Satisfaction: A 'Wave Formation' Framework” (with Khatai Aliyev and Orkhan Nadirov) – Journal of Happiness Studies.

“Taxes and The Incentive to Work Under Flat and Progressive Tax Systems in Slovakia.” (with Orkhan Nadirov and Drahomíra Pavelková) – Economics & Sociology, Vol. 14, No. 2, 2021.

“Carbon Taxes and the Composition of New Passenger Car Sales in Europe” (with Orkhan Nadirov and Jana Vychytilová) – Energies, Vol. 13, September 2020, Article 4631.

“Tax Progressivity and Entrepreneurial Dynamics.” (with Orkhan Nadirov) – Sustainability, Vol. 12, No. 9, 2020, 3584.

“To Work More or Less? The Impact of Taxes and Life Satisfaction on the Motivation to Work in Continental and Eastern Europe.” (with Orkhan Nadirov and Khatai Aliyev) – Economics & Sociology, Vol. 10, No. 3, 2017, pp. 266–280.

“Portfolio Risk-Return Analysis: The Case of the Automotive Industry in the Czech Republic.” (with Florin Aliu and Drahomira Pavelkova) – Journal of International Studies, Vol. 10, No. 4, 2017, pp. 72–83.

“Change in Earnings Quality Surrounding ERP Implementation.” (with Charu Sinha and Praveen Sinha) – Corporate Ownership & Control, Vol. 15, Issue 1, Fall 2017, pp. 8–17.

“Who Reacts to Income Tax Rate Changes? The Relationship Between Income Taxes and the Motivation to Work: The Case of Azerbaijan.” (with Orkhan Nadirov, Khatai Aliyev, and Minura Iskandarova) – Scientific Papers of the University of Pardubice, Series D, No. 40, February 2017, pp. 165–176.

“Modelling the Impact of Fiscal Policy On Non‑Oil GDP in a Resource Rich Country: Evidence From Azerbaijan” (with Khatai Aliyev and Orkhan Nadirov) – Acta Universitatis Agriculturae et Silviculturae Mendelianae Brunensis, Vol. 64, No. 6, 2016, 1869-1878.

“Cost Analysis – A Case Study of Participating in Groupon Sales” (with Frank Badua) – The Journal of American Academy of Business, Cambridge, Vol. 22, No. 1, September 2016, pp. 17–23.

“Modelling ‘Productivity’ of Budget Expenditure Items Before-and-After the Oil Boom in a Resource Rich Country: Evidence From Azerbaijan” (with Khatai Aliyev and Orkhan Nadirov) – International Journal of Economic Research, Vol. 13, No. 3, 2016, pp. 991–1023.

“Further Evidence on the Ability of FIFO and LIFO Earnings to Predict Operating Cash Flows: An Industry Specific Analysis” (with Brock Murdoch and Paul Krause) – Journal of Applied Business Research, 2013, Vol. 29 No. 4, July/August 2013, pp. 1231–1241.

“The Financial Performance of Global Information and Communication Technology Companies” (with Tim Bauer and Theophanis Stratopoulos) – Journal of Information Systems, Vol. 26, No. 2, Fall 2012, pp. 119–152.

“Earnings Under Generally Accepted Inventory Methods and the Prediction of Operating Cash Flows” (with Brock Murdoch and Paul Krause) – Journal of Business and Economic Perspectives, Volume XXXIX, No. 1, Spring/Summer 2012, pp. 61–72.

“A Meta-Analysis of the Effects of IT Investment on Firm Financial Performance” (with Jee-Hae Lim, Vernon J. Richardson, and Rod Smith) – Journal of Information Systems, Fall 2011, forthcoming.

“Emerging Issues of Management Education in the 21st Century.” (with Amy E. Hurley-Hanson and Cristina Giannantonio) – Global Business and Economics Anthology, Vol. 1, March 2011, pp. 1–7.

“Measuring the Performance of Clusters and Firms within Clusters Using the Residual Income Model” (with Drahomira Pavelkova) – Journal of Economics, Volume 57, No. 3, 2009, pp. 230–246, published by the Institute of Economic Research of the Slovak Academy of Sciences, (“Využití modelu založeného na přístupu residual income pro měření výkonnosti klastrů a firem v klastrech” – Ekonomický Časopis, roč. 57, č. 3, 2009. ISSN 0013-3035, Ekonomický ústav Slovenská akadémia vied.

“The Value Impact of Strategic Intent on Firms Engaged in Information Systems Outsourcing” (with Mark Beasley and Marianne Bradford) – International Journal of Accounting Information Systems, Vol. 10, Issue 2, June 2009, pp. 79–96.

“Using Accounting–Based Performance Measures to Assess the Business Value of Information Technologies and Systems.” (with Vernon J. Richardson, Rodney E. Smith, and Robert W. Zmud) – Robert J. Kauffman and Paul P. Tallon, eds., Economics, Information Systems and Electronic Commerce Research II: Advanced Empirical Methodologies. Volume 13 (Armonk, NY: M.E. Sharpe, 2009), pp. 135–154.

“The Financial Performance Effects of IT–Based Supply Chain Management Systems in Manufacturing Firms.” (with Vernon J. Richardson and Robert W. Zmud) – Journal of Operations Management, Vol. 25, Issue 4, June 2007, pp. 806–824.

“Analysts’ Forecasts and Investments in Information Technology.” (with Glenn Pfeiffer and Vernon J. Richardson) – International Journal of Accounting Information Systems, Vol. 7, Issue 3, Sept. 2006, pp. 238–250.

“Information Technology Investments and Firm Value.” (with Vernon J. Richardson and Theophanis Stratopoulos) – Information and Management, Vol. 42, Issue 7, Oct. 2005, pp. 989–1008.

“Reexamining the Value of Relevance of E–commerce Initiatives.” (with Vernon J. Richardson, Andrew Urbaczewski, and John D. Wells) – Journal of Management Information Systems, Vol. 21, No. 1, Summer 2004, pp. 57–84, (Special Issue on Measuring the Business Value of IT in e–Business Environments).

“Information Technology and Organizational Slack.” (with Kevin Dow and Theophanis Stratopoulos) – International Journal of Accounting Information Systems, Vol. 5, Issue 1, March 2004, pp. 51–63.

“Comprehensive Income: Evidence on the Effectiveness of FAS 130.” (with Paulette Ratliff) – The Journal of American Academy of Business, Cambridge, Vol. 4, No. 1, March 2004, pp. 228–232.

“The Value Relevance of Announcements of Transformational Information Technology Investments.” (with Vernon J. Richardson and Robert W. Zmud) – MIS Quarterly, Vol. 27, No. 4, December 2003, pp. 637–656.

“The Info–Tech ‘Productivity Paradox’ Dissected and Tested.” (with Kevin Dow and Theophanis Stratopoulos) – Management Accounting Quarterly, Vol. 5, No. 1, Fall 2003, pp. 31–39.

“Does the Market Recognize IT–Enabled Competitive Advantage?” (with Lewis Davis and Theophanis Stratopoulos) – Information and Management, Vol. 40, Issue 7, August 2003, pp. 705–716.

“Financial Analysis of Potential Benefits from ERP Systems Adoption.” (with Andreas Nicolaou and Theophanis Stratopoulos) – The Journal of Business and Information Technology, Vol. 2, Issue 1, Spring 2003, pp. 40–50.

“Determinants of a Sustainable Competitive Advantage Due to an IT–Enabled Strategy.” (with Theophanis Stratopoulos) – The Journal of Strategic Information Systems, Vol. 12, Issue 1, March 2003, pp. 7–28.

“Discussion of Impact of IT on Public Accounting Firm Productivity.” – Journal of Information Systems, Vol. 16, No. 2, Fall 2002, pp. 223–226.

“DuPont Analysis of an IT–Enabled Competitive Advantage.” (with Theophanis Stratopoulos) – International Journal of Accounting Information Systems, Vol. 3, Issue 3, Sept. 2002, pp. 165–176.

“Returns on investments in information technology: Beyond the productivity paradox.” (with Vernon J. Richardson) – The Capco Institute Journal, Issue 6, 2002, pp. 83–91.

“Returns on Investments in Information Technology: A Research Synthesis.” (with Vernon J. Richardson) – Journal of Information Systems, Vol. 16, No. 1, Spring 2002, pp. 7–30. This article was awarded the American Accounting Association Information Systems Section Notable Contributions to the Literature Award in 2006.

“Does Successful Investment in Information Technology Solve the Productivity Paradox?” (with Theophanis Stratopoulos) – Information and Management, Vol. 38, Issue 2, Dec. 2000, pp. 103–117.
