= Bob Galliers =

Robert D. Galliers is Bentley University's Distinguished Professor Emeritus having served as Provost (2002-2009) and Professor Emeritus at the University of Warwick. Previously, he was Professor and Research Director in the Department of Information Systems at the London School of Economics (LSE), the Lucas Professor of Business Management Systems at Warwick Business School (where he also served as Dean), and Foundation Professor of Information Systems at Curtin University, Western Australia (where he was Head of School).

Additionally, he served as an Associate Director/Senior Advisor for EFMD Quality Services, Belgium for the period 2018-2023 and was a member of EFMD’s EQUIS Accreditation Board for seven years previously. Other board memberships included the Management Committee of the Chartered Association of Business Schools (CABS) Academic Journal Guide.

He has held a number of visiting professorships nationally and internationally (including at the Australian School of Business, University of New South Wales; Hong Kong City and Hong Kong Polytechnic Universities; University of St Gallen, Switzerland; INSEAD, France; LSE, UK; King's College, University of London; Loughborough University, UK; Brunel University, UK; University of the Witwatersrand, South Africa; National University of Singapore, and the European Institute for Advanced Studies in Management, Belgium). He has served on various university advisory boards (including Tilburg University, The Netherlands; National University of Ireland, Galway; Queen's University, Northern Ireland; Bradford University, UK; Turku School of Business, Finland).

Bob Galliers is the founding editor-in-chief of The Journal of Strategic Information Systems, which he led from 1991 (its inception) to December 2018. He is a Fellow of the British Computer Society, the Royal Society of Arts, and the Association for Information Systems, of which he was President in 1999. He received the Association for Information Systems LEO Award for exceptional lifetime achievement in the field in 2012 and an Honorary Doctor of Science degree from Turku University, Finland in 1992. In 2002 he served as Program Chair for the International Conference on Information Systems held in Barcelona.

He has been keynote speaker at various international conferences, including the European Conference on IS; the Australasian Conference on IS; the Scandinavian Conference on IS; IFIP WG 8.2; IADIS; the UKAIS Conference, and the Mediterranean Conference on IS.

In 1966 he won a scholarship from Harrow Weald County Grammar School (Middlesex, England) to Harvard University, USA from which he graduated with an AB cum laude degree in Economics. While at Harvard, he competed for the Varsity track and field team, winning the Heptagonal Games (Ivy league) championship in long jump in 1969. He also competed as a freshman for the combined Harvard-Yale team versus Oxford-Cambridge at the White City stadium in London in 1967.

On his return to the UK, he worked in social work administration in London for seven years before gaining an MA with distinction in Management Systems at Lancaster University and, subsequently, a PhD in Information Systems (IS) from the LSE.

Bob Galliers has published widely in leading IS and Management journals such as MIS Quarterly, the Journal of Management Studies, Long Range Planning, Information Systems Journal and the Journal of Management Information Systems. His work has been cited over 19,000 times according to Google Scholar.

His recent books include, The Cambridge Handbook of Qualitative Digital Research (Cambridge University Press, 2023); Managing Digital Innovation: A Knowledge Perspective (Bloomsbury, 2020); Strategic Information Management: Theory and Practice, 5th edition (Routledge, 2020); The Routledge Companion to Management Information Systems (Routledge, 2017, a 2nd edition of which has been published in 2025). Exploring IS Research Approaches - Readings and Reflections was first published by Routledge in 2006.

Among notable contributions to the field of Information Systems, Professor Galliers introduced the notion of Information Systems Strategizing (in contrast to Michael Porter's conception of strategy) with a focus on actual practice. Strategizing, according to his latest publications, involves ongoing processes of knowledge exploration and exploitation.

Bob Galliers has successfully supervised around 30 PhD students during his time at the LSE, Warwick Business School and Bentley University, and has acted as an external examiner of PhD dissertations on many occasions both at home and abroad.

== See also ==
- Frank Land
