= Old High German Tatian =

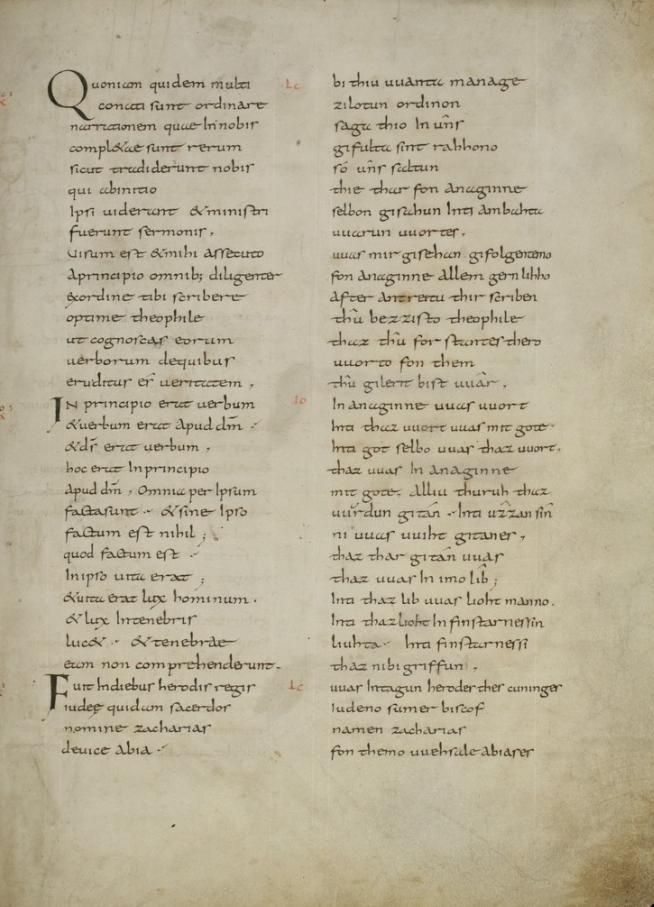
The Gospel Harmony of Tatian (St. Gallen, Stiftsbibliothek, Cod. Sang. 56: ) Page 25

The Old High German Tatian is a translation of the Latin version of Tatian's Diatessaron into Old High German. The translation was created in the Abbey of Fulda under Rabanus Maurus's supervision around the year 830 and a copy has been located at the Abbey of Saint Gall since the 10th century, where it is classified as the Codex Sangallensis 56.

== The manuscript and its transmission ==
The Old High German Tatian is one of the most significant translations created during the Carolingian Renaissance, next to the Old High German Isidor. It contains the text in both Latin and Old High German. During its creation, the Diatessaron, a gospel harmony written around 170 AD, was combined with a transcript of the Codex Fuldensis (Codex Bonifatianus I), turning it into a bilingual.

Though the manuscript G (St. Gallen's Cod. Sang. 56) is the only known surviving one, the existence of other manuscripts is suspected. This assumption is based on the fact that there are references to another manuscript in excerpts from the margins of the Paris Conversations (Paris, Bibl. Nat., Ms. Lat. 7461) and in text samples from the "De literis et lingua Getarum siue Gothorum" (1597) by Bonaventura Vulcanius. An incomplete copy of said manuscript is currently at the Bodleian Library in Oxford (Ms. Jun. 13).

== Stylistics ==
The Old High German Tatian is a literal translation split into two columns, with the Latin text on the left and the Old High German text on the right. The two texts are written in the same line and word order, and the verbatim translation is only occasionally replaced by a freer translation technique.

Furthermore, the structuring of the paragraphs and the highlighting of the Latin texts through the use of initials makes the German text appear subordinate to the Latin text. The manuscript appears to have been compiled by six scribes, each with different abilities and writing styles, which makes the overall text seem inconsistent. However, the Fulda style of writing largely dominates.

== Text sample ==
Section 97

Luke 15:11-31: The Parable of the Prodigal Son:

Latin

Ait autem: homo quidam habuit duos filios. 12. Et dixit adolescentior ex illis patri: pater, da mihi portionem substantiae quae me contingit. Et divisit illis substantiam. 13. Et non post multos dies congregatis omnibus adolescentior filius peregre profectus est in regionem longinquam et ibi dissipavit substantiam suam vivendo luxuriose.

Old High German

Quad tho: sum man habata zuuene suni. Quad tho der iungoro fon then themo fater: fater, gib mir teil thero hehti thiu mir gibure. Her tho teilta thia héht. Nalles after manegen tagon gisamonoten allen ther iungoro sun elilentes fuor in uerra lantscaf inti dar ziuuarf sina héht lebento uirnlustigo.

14. Et postquam omnia consummasset, facta est fames valida in regione illa, et ipse coepit egere. 15. Et abiit et adhaesit uni civium regionis illius, et misit illum in villam suam, ut pasceret porcos. 16. Et cupiebat implere ventrem suum de siliquis quas porci manducabant, et nemo illi dabat.

Inti after thiu her iz al uorlós, uuard hungar strengi in thero lantscefi; her bigonda tho armen. Inti gieng inti zuoclebeta einemo thero burgliuto thero lantscefi, inti santa inan in sin thorf, thaz her fuotriti suuin. Inti girdinota gifullen sina uuamba fon siliquis theo thiu suuin azzun, inti nioman imo ni gab.

== Purpose ==
The intentions were two-fold:

1. The multilingualism of the Carolingian Empire is the background to the Bible translations from the 8th and 9th century. It posed a challenge to the rulers of that time, as the principles of the Christian faith needed to be conveyed in a language that all Christian inhabitants of the Frankish Empire could understand. Additionally, the situation must be viewed in the context of the regulations on the teaching of faith issued by Charlemagne (Admonitio generalis, 789 AD), the Saxon wars, and the Council of Frankfurt (794 AD). These events all led to a number of translations of texts on faith as well as of functional texts for church life at the beginning of the 9th century. Considering these circumstances, the Old High German Tatian may have served to support and accelerate the missionary work of the Christian rulers in the West.

2. In regard to the training of clerics, the Old High German Tatian may have served as a precursor to the study of the individual Gospels. For those whose knowledge of the Latin language was limited or nonexistent, it would have helped cultivate a better understanding of the original texts. For those who knew Latin, the manuscript could have served as a way to check the veracity of translations.

== Significance ==
Along with the works of Notker the German and Otfrid of Weissenburg, the Old High German Tatian is one of the greatest Old High German manuscripts. In terms of language history, its significance lies in the fact that it constitutes the first documented example of a uniform German text. Furthermore, it provides insights into linguistic-historical developments, as well as into Old High German vocabulary. Additionally, the Old High German Tatian influenced the Heliand, particularly regarding its choice of subject matter.

== See also ==
- Diatessaron

== Edition ==
- Sievers, Eduard, ed. (1892). Tatian : Lateinisch und altdeutsch mit ausführlichem Glossar. Paderborn: Schöningh.

== Bibliography ==
- Bostock, J. Knight; King, K. C.; McLintock, D. R. (1976). A Handbook on Old High German Literature (2nd ed.). Oxford. pp. 157–168. ISBN 0-19-815392-9.
- Brunner, Horst (2005). Geschichte der deutschen Literatur des Mittelalters im Überblick [An Overview of the History of German Literature from the Middle Ages] (in German). Stuttgart: Reclam. ISBN 3-15-009485-2.
- Berger, Bruno; Rupp, Heinz, eds. (1968). Deutsches Literatur Lexikon [German Literature Lexicon] (in German). Vol. 1 (3rd ed.). Munich: Francke Verlag. pp. 84f.
- Hellgardt, Ernst (1991). Killy, Walther (ed.). Althochdeutscher Tatian [Old High German Tatian]. Literaturlexikon. Autoren und Werke deutscher Sprache (in German). Vol. 2. Munich: Bertelsmann Lexikon Verlag. pp. 307f. ISBN 3-570-04672-9.
- Kartschoke, Dieter (1997). Angermann, Norbert (ed.). Tatian, althochdeutsch [Tatian, Old High German]. Lexikon des Mittelalters: Stadt (Byzantinisches Reich) bis Werl (in German). Vol. 8. Stuttgart and Weimar: J. B. Metzler. ISBN 3-89659-908-9.
- Koch, Hans Jürgen, ed. (2006). Die deutsche Literatur in Text und Darstellung. Mittelalter I [German Literature in Text and Depictions. Middle Ages I] (in German). Stuttgart: Reclam. ISBN 3-15-009601-4.
- Masser A (2010). "Tatian". In Ruh K, Keil G, Schröder W (eds.). Die deutsche Literatur des Mittelalters. Verfasserlexikon. Vol. 9. Berlin, New York: Walter De Gruyter. cols 620–628. ISBN 978-3-11-022248-7. With bibliography.
- Meineke, Eckhard; Schwerdt, Judith (2001). Einführung in das Althochdeutsche [Introduction to Old High German] (in German). Paderborn: Verlag Ferdinand Schöningh. pp. 144–148. ISBN 3-8252-2167-9.
- Wesseling, Klaus-Gunther (1996). Tatian der Syrer [Tatian the Syrian]. Biographisch-Bibliographisches Kirchenlexikon (in German). Vol. 11. Nordhausen: Verlag Traugott Bautz. pp. 552–571. ISBN 3-88309-064-6.
