= International Centre for Higher Education Research Kassel =

Research centre at the University of Kassel, Germany

International Centre for Higher Education Research (INCHER-Kassel)
- Category: Research institute
- Location: University of Kassel, Germany
- Types of research: Basic research, applied research
- Fields of study: Higher education studies, science studies, organization studies, innovation studies
- Director: Georg Krücken
- Staff: Approximately 40
- Homepage: INCHER Kassel

The International Centre for Higher Education Research Kassel (INCHER-Kassel) is an interdisciplinary research establishment of the University of Kassel, Germany in the field of higher education research and scientific research on higher education institutions. Researchers at INCHER-Kassel are involved in the study of various aspects related to higher education, university studies, and science, and work on a broad range of themes and disciplines at the interface of higher education systems and other social contexts. INCHER-Kassel is one among the few higher education research institutions in Germany that is attached to a university and is the only research establishment of its kind that has operated successfully for more than three decades. It is widely considered as one of the most significant international institutions in higher education research.

== History ==
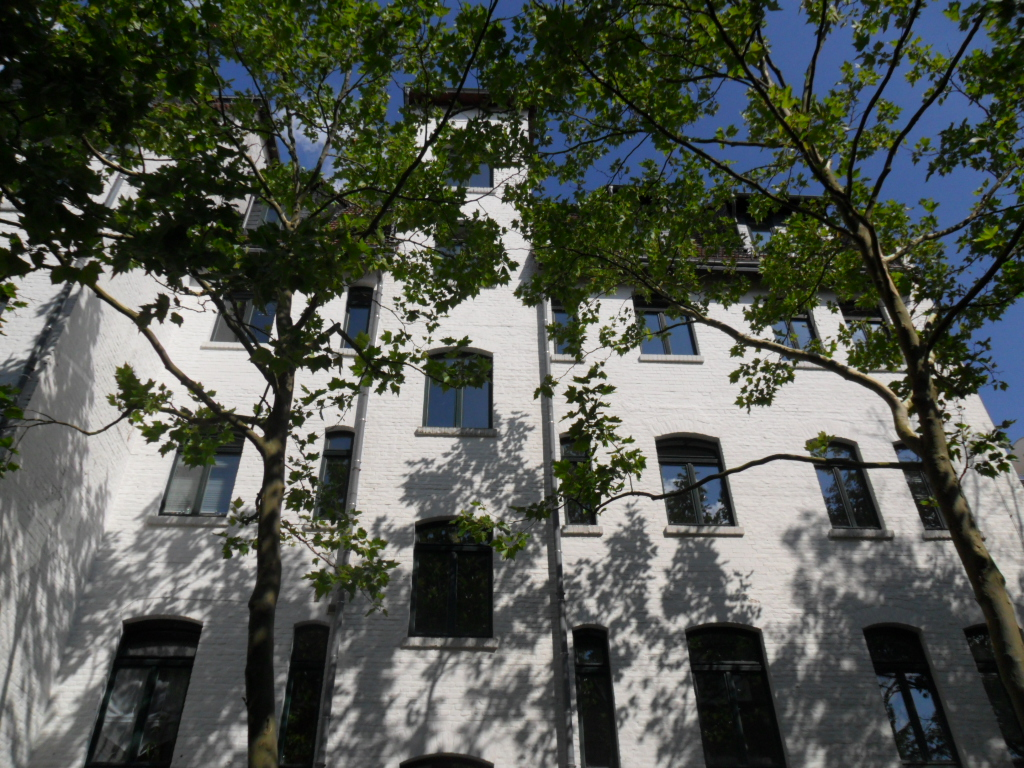
Back view of INCHER-Kassel

INCHER-Kassel was initially established in 1978 as the Centre for Research on Higher Education and Work (Wissenschaftliches Zentrum für Berufs- und Hochschulforschung – WZI) at the University of Kassel (formerly known as Kassel Polytechnic University). It was conceived to carry out a continuous scientific reflection about practical problems in higher education institutions and provide essential scientific inputs in order to achieve academic objectives and effect changes. The formal establishment of the Centre took place alongside the appointment of the sociologist and higher education researcher Ulrich Teichler as the first Professor for Research on Higher Education and Work. His efforts over the next 30 years shaped the character of not just INCHER-Kassel, but of German-speaking higher education research in general. In 2005, an external commission comprising Jutta Allmendinger, Klaus Landfried, and Björn Wittrock evaluated the Centre for the first time. They recommended the continuation and expansion of its activities, and also proposed certain directional shifts. This positive evaluation helped the Kassel University Board to decide for the continuation of the Centre after Ulrich Teichler’s retirement and to explore possibilities of expansion. The Centre changed its name to International Centre for Higher Education Research Kassel (INCHER-Kassel) in March 2006 in order to stress more on the international character of its activities and also have an acronym easily comprehensible in an international context. A directorial change took place at INCHER-Kassel in 2011 when the sociologist and higher education researcher Georg Krücken accepted the directorship of INCHER-Kassel along with the professorship of higher education research at Kassel University. This change saw a stronger orientation towards research on the relationship between higher education and other fields of society, and a sharper structuration of higher education research with other cross-cutting research areas such as knowledge, organisations, and innovation. Since 2016 Guido Bünstorf is the Executive Vice Director, Professor of Economics at the University of Kassel, who represents the economic science in the interdisciplinary research of INCHER-Kassel.

== Research Areas ==
Over the last three decades, INCHER-Kassel has carried out numerous research projects focused on studying questions related to the relationship between higher education and employment, higher education planning and organisation, implementation of higher education reforms, development of higher education systems from an international perspective, international student mobility, management in higher education institutions, evaluation of higher education, internationalisation of higher education institutions, student behavior and student identity, and professions within higher education institutions, among other topics. Treated alongside are other cross-cutting themes such as internationalisation, social inequality, and gender-related issues. INCHER-Kassel is well known for its international focus. Most research projects follow an international comparative approach and are carried out in international research teams. The founding of the Consortium of Higher Education Researchers (CHER) is one of INCHER-Kassel’s many initiatives. The Centre is part of a wide-ranging network of collaborating international research establishments and regularly hosts foreign scholars for long research stays. INCHER-Kassel is particularly active in carrying out third-party funded research projects. It receives funding from national and international organisations such as the European Commission, the Federal Ministry for Education and Research (BMBF), the Volkswagen Foundation, the Federal Ministry of Education and Science, the German Research Foundation (DFG), the German Academic Exchange Service (DAAD), the Donor’s Association for the Promotion of Humanities and Sciences in Germany, or the German Rectors’ Conference, among others.

Since 2018 INCHER-Kassel examines in the Interdisciplinary PhD Program "Elite Reproduction in Transition?" (ELBHA) the role the university system is playing in the process of elite reproduction.

== Organisation ==
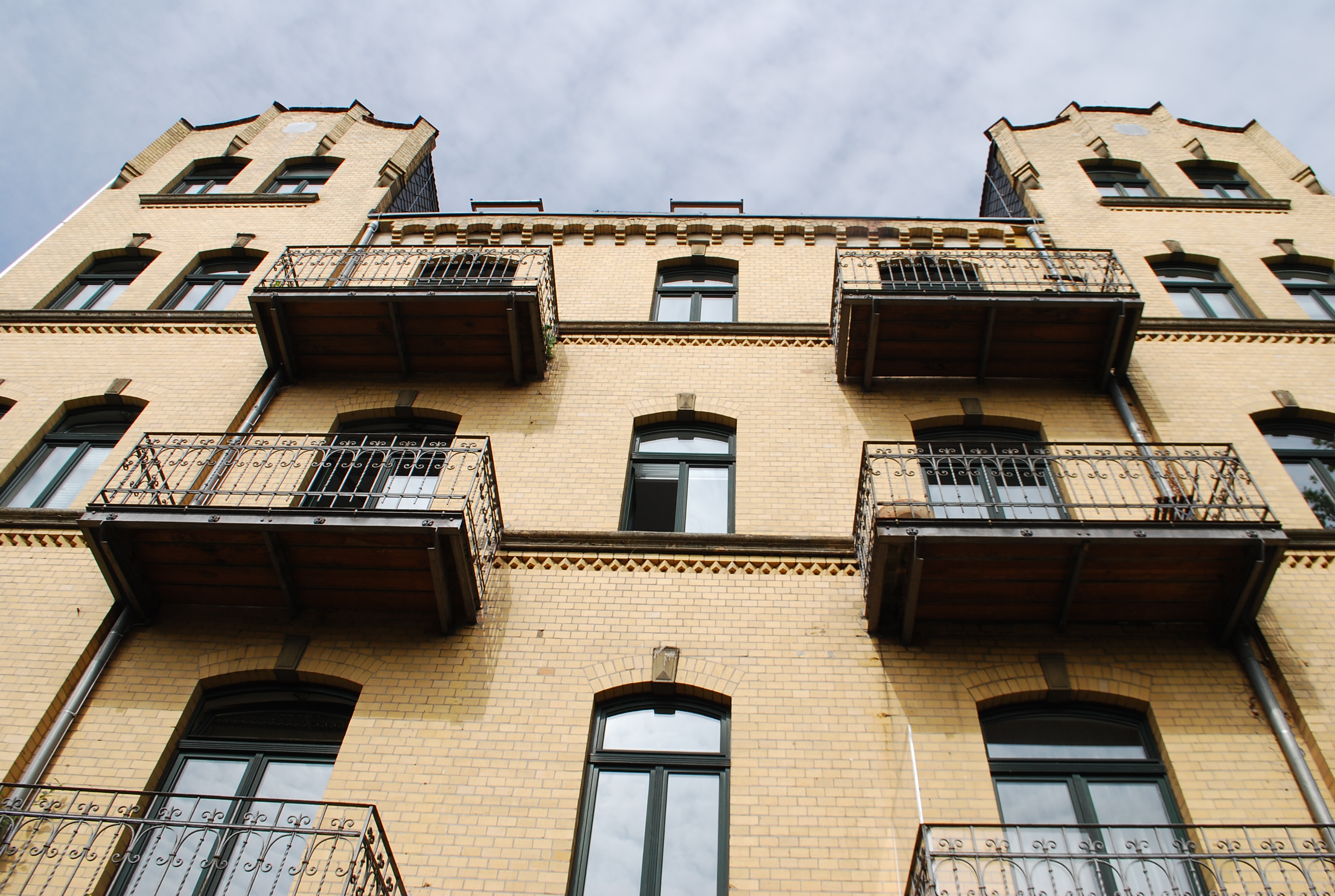
Front view of INCHER-Kassel

The director heads INCHER-Kassel and is assisted by a vice director and manager in this task. In the first 30 years of the Centre’s existence, the position of the director has been held by either members of the executive board or by professors. Ulrich Teichler was the director for a total of 16 years; Barbara Kehm held the position from April 2004 to September 2011. Since October 2011, Georg Krücken heads INCHER-Kassel. The members of the executive board, comprising professors belonging to INCHER-Kassel, academic staff representatives, administrative and technical staff, and students, make decisions concerning research programmes and the organisation of INCHER-Kassel. Additionally, an advisory board consisting of experts from other universities and research institutes, and also from funding agencies, advise the Centre in strategic and technical matters. The current advisory board has for members, Dr. Sabine Behrenbeck, Prof. Dr. Dr. h.c. Ulrike Beisiegel, Edith Braun, Prof. Dr. Sabine Maasen, Dr. Georg Licht, Prof. Dr. Christine Musselin (deputy chairperson), and Prof. Dr. Uwe Schimank (chairperson). Around 40-45 people, including many PhD students, work and research at INCHER-Kassel. The Centre also regularly hosts international guest lecturers and scholars.

Research work at INCHER-Kassel has produced over 2,000 publications that have appeared in scientific journals and books from various publishing houses. A part of the main research findings have appeared in the Higher Education and Work book series from Campus publishers, and until 2013, a total of 76 titles have appeared in INCHER-Kassel’s home publication series Werkstattberichte. This series is now available online under Working Papers on the Centre’s website.
