= Maris Martinsons =

- Born: Latvia
- Occupation: Academic
- Title: Professor

Academic background
- Education: University of Toronto, University of Warwick

Academic work
- Discipline: Management
- Institutions: City University of Hong Kong, Stockholm School of Economics, and the University of Toronto

Maris Martinsons (Latvian: Māris Martinsons) is a Latvian-Canadian academic who is professor of management science associated with the City University of Hong Kong, the Stockholm School of Economics, and the University of Toronto.

Martinsons has been a visiting professor at a number of universities worldwide and is based in the Asia-Pacific region. He has also served as editor for the following scholarly journals: IEEE Transactions on Engineering Management, the Journal of Applied Management Studies, the Journal of Information Technology Management, the Journal of Management Systems, and the Communications of the ACM.

== Early life and education ==
A Latvian-Canadian who was educated in both North America and Europe. He received his B.A.Sc. in engineering science and MBA from the University of Toronto, and a PhD in industrial and business studies from the University of Warwick.

== Career ==
Martinsons has worked as a business consultant for companies including Ernst & Young, DRI/McGraw-Hill, and McKinsey & Co., and has served as an external advisor to the governments of Hong Kong and Latvia.

According to Google Scholar, Maris Martinsons has authored 3 of the 10 most cited articles on Chinese management while his publications have received more than 7,000 citations. According to a Stanford University study, Professor Martinsons ranks among the Top 2% of the world's scientists.

Martinsons received the Distinguished Young Scholar Award from the International Association of Management in 1995

Martinsons has been involved in action research and e-learning.

He worked to internationalize the (U.S.) Academy of Management, primarily by bridging the east–west divide.

== Other interests ==
Martinsons is also an athlete, having represented Canada, Latvia and Hong Kong in international sporting competitions.

== Publications ==
=== Book ===
- Information technology and the challenge for Hong Kong / edited by Janice M. Burn and Maris G. Martinsons. Hong Kong : Hong Kong University Press, c1997. ISBN 962-209-420-1

=== Dissertation ===
- Strategic Intelligence in Hong Kong, How chief executives managed information/knowledge amidst the environmental uncertainty of pre-handover Hong Kong / University of Warwick

=== Scholarship ===
According to Google Scholar, the most cited peer-reviewed journal articles by Maris Martinsons are:

- Martinsons, M., Davison, R., Tse, D. (1999). The balanced scorecard: A foundation for the strategic management of information systems, Decision Support Systems, 25(1), pp. 71–88. Cited more than 900 times in English and 200 times in other languages.
- Davison, R.M., Martinsons, M.G., Kock, N. (2004). Principles of canonical action research, Information Systems Journal, 14(1), pp. 65–86. Cited more than 1000 times.
- Martinsons, M.G., Westwood, R.I. (1997). Management information systems in the Chinese business culture: An explanatory theory, Information and Management, 32(5), pp. 215–228. Cited more than 700 times in Chinese and 300 times in English.
- Martinsons, M.G. (2008). Relationship-based e-commerce: Theory and evidence from China, Information Systems Journal, 18(4), pp. 331–356. Cited more than 600 times, including 250 times in English.
- Martinsons, M.G., Chong, P.K.C. (1999). The influence of human factors and specialist involvement on information systems success, Human Relations, 52(1), pp. 123–151. Cited 300 times.
- Davison, R.M., Ou, C.X.J., Martinsons, M.G. (2013). Information technology to support informal knowledge sharing, Information Systems Journal 23(1), pp. 89–109. Cited more than 200 times.
- Martinsons, M.G., Davison, R.M. (2007). Strategic decision making and support systems: Contrasting American, Japanese and Chinese Management, Decision Support Systems, 43(1), pp. 284–300. Cited more than 150 times.
- Martinsons, M.G. (1993) Outsourcing information systems: A strategic partnership with risks, Long Range Planning, 26 (3), pp. 18–25. Cited more than 150 times.
- Martinsons, M.G. (2002). Electronic commerce in China, Information & Management, 39(5), pp. 71–79. Cited more than 100 times in English and 200 times in Chinese.
- Martinsons, M.G. (2004). ERP in China, Communications of the ACM, 47(7), pp. 65–68. Cited more than 150 times.
- Burrows, G.R., Drummond, D.L., Martinsons, M.G. (2005). Knowledge management in China, Communications of the ACM, 48(4), pp 44–48. Cited more than 50 times in English and 150 times in Chinese.
- Martinsons, M.G., Hempel, P.S. (1995). Chinese management systems: historical and cross-cultural perspectives, Journal of Management Systems, 7(1), pp. 1–11. Cited more than 60 times in English and 200 times in Chinese.
- Martinsons, M.G., Martinsons, A.G.B. (1996). Conquering cultural constraints to cultivate Chinese management creativity and innovation, Journal of Management Development 15(9), pp. 18–35. Cited more than 100 times.
- Martinsons, M.G. (1994). Benchmarking human resource information systems in Canada and Hong Kong, Information & Management, 26 (6), pp. 305–316. Cited more than 100 times.
