= Nizar Ibrahim =

German-Moroccan paleontologist and anatomist

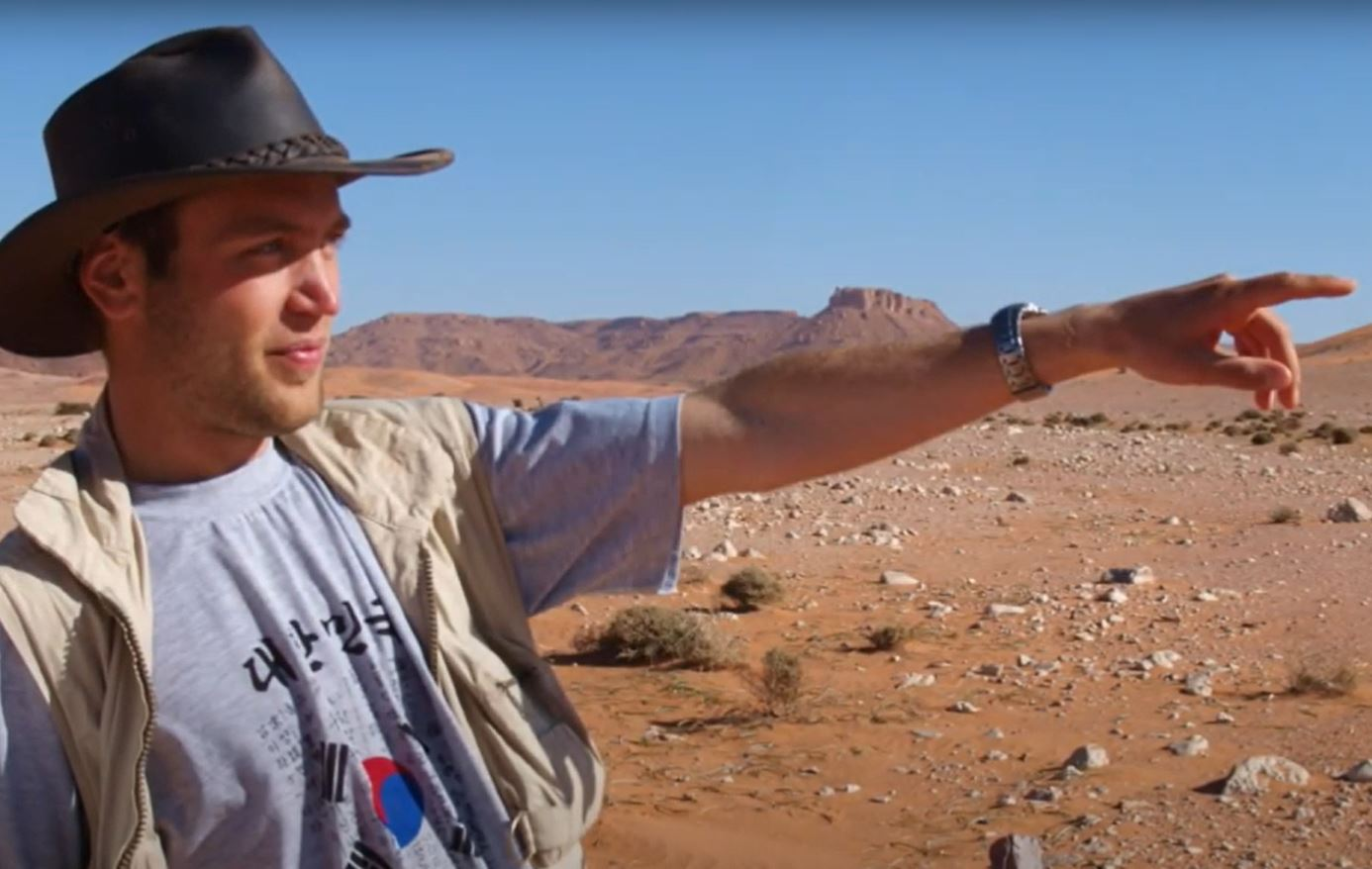
- Born: 8 September 1982 (age 44); West Berlin, West Germany
- Education: University of Bristol (B.Sc.); University College Dublin (Ph.D.)
- Scientific career
- Fields: Paleontology, Anatomy
- Workplaces: University of Portsmouth

Nizar Ibrahim (born 8 September 1982) is a German-Moroccan vertebrate palaeontologist and comparative anatomist. He is the scientific director of the Dinosauriermuseum Altmühtal. Ibrahim has led several expeditions to Africa's Sahara and is notable for his research on fossil vertebrates from the Kem Kem Group, including pterosaurs, crocodyliforms, and dinosaurs. In recent years, research led by Ibrahim radically changed ideas about the morphology and the lifestyle of one of the largest predatory dinosaurs, Spinosaurus aegyptiacus. Ibrahim also has interests in bioinformatics and contributed to the NSF-funded Phenoscape project. He regularly engages with the public and is a speaker with the National Geographic Speakers Bureau.

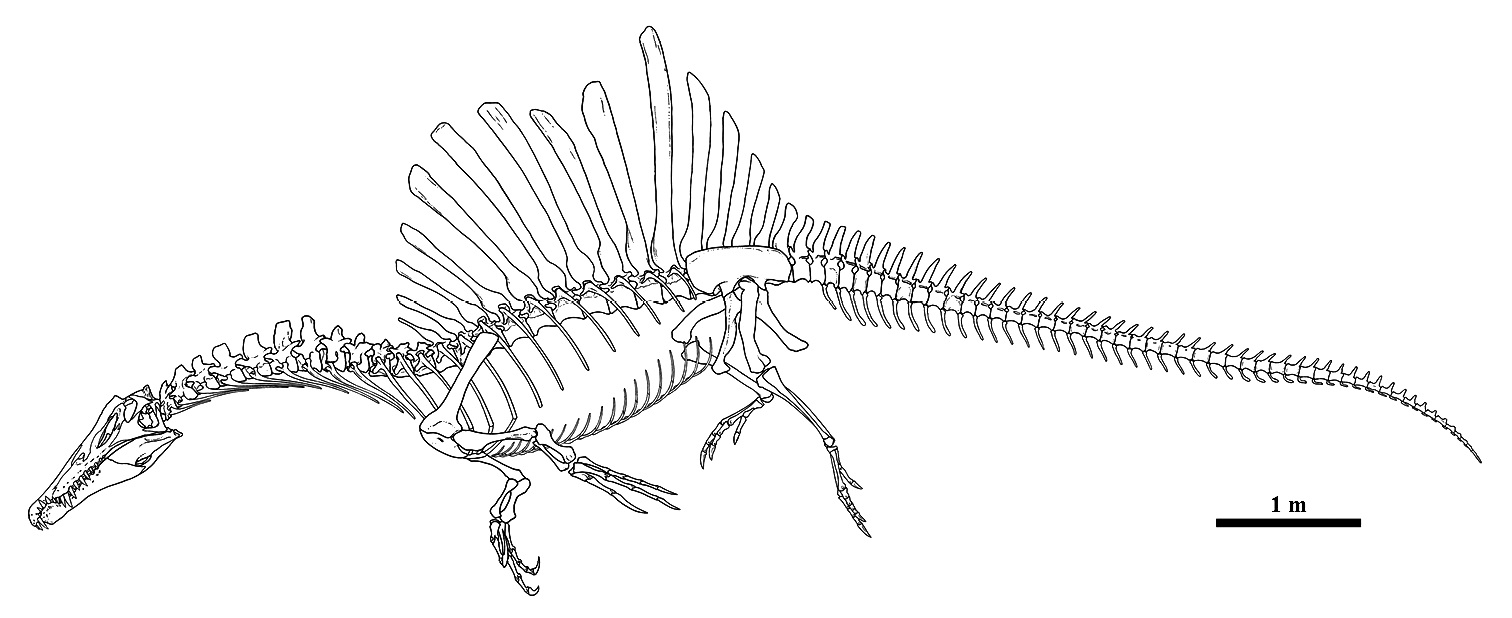
S. aegyptiacus skeletal reconstruction in swimming posture (prior to the discovery of the tail fin)

== Biography ==
=== Youth and education ===
Nizar Ibrahim was born on 8 September 1982 in West Berlin, West Germany. He has German and Moroccan ancestry, with his grandfather being the third Prime Minister of Morocco, Abdallah Ibrahim. At 5 years old, he decided that he was going to become a palaeontologist while reading a book on dinosaurs.

He obtained a Bachelor of science in geology and biology from the University of Bristol in 2006. In 2011, he obtained his PhD from the University College Dublin's School of Medicine and Medical Science. He carried out his postdoctoral studies at the University of Chicago for four years.

=== Career ===
He was an assistant professor at the University of Detroit Mercy, where he taught human anatomy, comparative anatomy, and evolution between 2018 and 2020. He was also a senior lecturer at the University of Portsmouth. He is now the scientific director of the Dinosauriermuseum Altmühltal. In Morocco, he works with a number of Moroccan researchers and students based at Hassan II University. Ibrahim was one of 21 people selected as a TED fellow in 2015, which makes him the "first palaeontologist in the history of the program".

== Awards and recognition ==
- In 2014, he was selected as a member of National Geographic's Emerging Explorer Program.
- In 2015, he was named a TED Fellow.
- In 2015, he was listed in Crain's "40 Under 40".
- In 2019, his Spinosaurus discovery was named one of the Top 20 Scientific Discoveries of the Decade by National Geographic.

== Selected publications ==
- Ibrahim, Nizar; et al. (26 May 2010). "A New Pterosaur (Pterodactyloidea: Azhdarchidae) from the Upper Cretaceous of Morocco". PLOS ONE. 5 (5) e10875. Bibcode:2010PLoSO...510875I. doi:10.1371/journal.pone.0010875. ISSN 1932-6203. PMC 2877115. PMID 20520782.
- Ibrahim, Nizar; Kutschera, Ulrich (2013). "The ornithologist Alfred Russel Wallace and the controversy surrounding the dinosaurian origin of birds". Theory in Biosciences. 132 (4): 267–275. doi:10.1007/s12064-013-0192-5. ISSN 1611-7530. PMID 23975643. S2CID 13185739.
- Ibrahim, Nizar; Varricchio, David J.; Sereno, Paul C.; et al. (6 March 2014). "Dinosaur Footprints and Other Ichnofauna from the Cretaceous Kem Kem Beds of Morocco". PLOS ONE. 9 (3) e90751. Bibcode:2014PLoSO...990751I. doi:10.1371/journal.pone.0090751. ISSN 1932-6203. PMC 3946209. PMID 24603467.
- Ibrahim, Nizar; Sereno, Paul C.; et al. (26 September 2014). "Semiaquatic adaptations in a giant predatory dinosaur" (PDF). Science. 345 (6204): 1613–1616. Bibcode:2014Sci...345.1613I. doi:10.1126/science.1258750. ISSN 0036-8075. PMID 25213375. S2CID 34421257.
- Ibrahim, Nizar; Sasso, C. Dal; et al. (2016). "Evidence of a derived titanosaurian (Dinosauria, Sauropoda) in the "Kem Kem beds" of Morocco, with comments on sauropod paleoecology in the Cretaceous of Africa". Cretaceous Period: Biotic Diversity and Biogeography: 149–159.
- Ibrahim, Nizar; Sereno, Paul C.; et al. (21 April 2020). "Geology and paleontology of the Upper Cretaceous Kem Kem Group of eastern Morocco". ZooKeys (928): 1–216. Bibcode:2020ZooK..928....1I. doi:10.3897/zookeys.928.47517. ISSN 1313-2989. PMC 7188693. PMID 32362741.
