= Ralf Wagner =

German university professor

Ralf Wagner (born 1968) is a German university professor for administration in the field of business science at the University of Kassel. Since 2006 he has been the chair of the SVI Endowed Chair for International Direct Marketing there.

== Life ==
Ralf Wagner studied business administration with a focus on marketing at Bielefeld University. He received his doctor's degree in 2000 with the title "Modeling and Analysis of Multiple Competitive Interactions with Sales Promotions", while working with Reinhold Decker. Wagner received his Venia legendi for common administration in 2008 from the Bielefeld University for the habilitation paper of "Complex Patterns in Marketing Management". He began at the newly founded Dialog Marketing Competence Center (DMCC) at the University of Kassel as a deputy chair then became a professor.

His fields of study are marketing interaction in different cultures, direct marketing in alteration, competitive interaction, competitive intelligence, and quantitative methods of marketing research.

== Books ==
- Decker, R.; R. Wagner (2002): Marketingforschung: Methoden und Modelle zur Bestimmung des Käuferverhaltens, München, Moderne Industrie
- Wagner, R. (2001): Multiple Wettbewerbsreaktionen im Produktmanagement, Wiesbaden, DUV & Gabler.
