= Georg Krücken =

German sociologist (1962–2024)

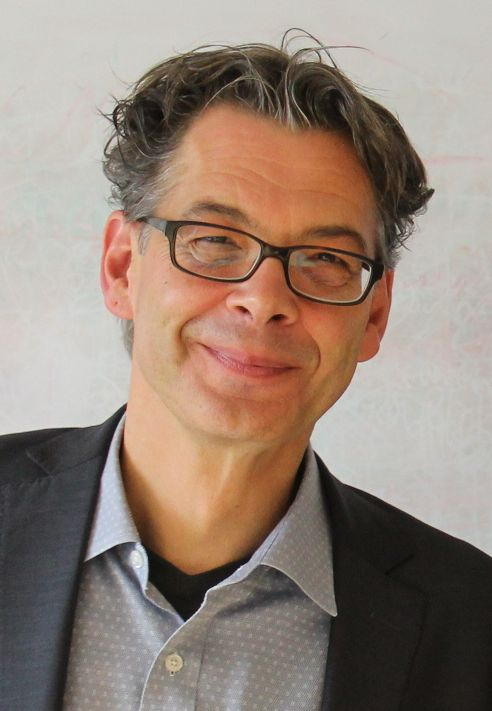
Krücken in 2018

Georg Krücken (21 September 1962 – 7 October 2024) was a German sociologist and higher education researcher. He was director of the International Center for Higher Education Research Kassel (INCHER-Kassel) at the University of Kassel.

== Life and career ==
Born in Bad Honnef on 21 September 1962, Krücken studied sociology, philosophy and political science at the universities of Bielefeld and Bologna from 1981 to 1989. With a scholarship from the Studienstiftung des deutschen Volkes he earned his PhD in 1996 at the Faculty of Sociology in Bielefeld with a dissertation focused on Risk Transformation.

Krücken habilitated in January 2004 in Bielefeld. From 1999 to 2001 he was visiting scholar at the Department of Sociology at Stanford University and in 2005 was visiting professor at the Center de Sociologie des Organisations. He returned to Stanford as a visiting scholar at the School of Education in the summer semester of 2011 and in 2016 completed a research semester as a visiting scholar at the Sciences Po, Center de Sociologie des Organisations in Paris. He was a regular guest lecturer at the University of Vienna.

Between 2006 and 2011, Krücken held the first Chair of Science Organization, Higher Education and Science Management at the German University of Administrative Sciences in Speyer, before joining the University of Kassel in 2011, where became director of the International Center for Higher Education Research Kassel (INCHER-Kassel).

In 2014 he became chairman of the Gesellschaft für Hochschulforschung. In 2016 he was elected a member of the Academia Europaea.

Krücken died of cancer on 7 October 2024, at the age of 62.

== Research ==
In his research Krücken focused on higher education research and the sociology of science. His special interests lie on the combination of neo-institutionalism in organizational research with a macro-sociological view of the world. As both approaches are particularly based on American theory and research, Krücken adds European strands of social theory. His dissertation on the works of John W. Meyer also contributed to the spread of neo-institutionalist approaches in Germany.

In addition to many publications, his scientific work led to the European research network New Institutionalism] in 2004, of which he was a co-founder and spokesman. It organizes annual scientific conferences in various European countries.

== Books ==
Higher Education in Germany—Recent Developments in an International Perspective. Cham: Springer International Publishing AG, 2018 (together with mit Otto Hüther). Gerhard Casper, President Emeritus and Professor Emeritus, Stanford University, comments on this book: "The foreign observer of German higher education, even the informed foreign observer, struggles to find denominators, not to mention common denominators of a bewildering array of approaches. Otto Hüther and Georg Krücken, in this book, do an absolutely splendid job of offering theoretical perspectives, qualitative and quantitative data, and comparative assessments."

New Themes in Institutional Analysis. Topics and Issues from European Research (edited together with Carmelo Mazza, Renate Meyer und Peter Walgenbach). Cheltenham: Edward Elgar, 2017, ISBN 978-1-78471-686-8.
