= International Summer University Kassel =

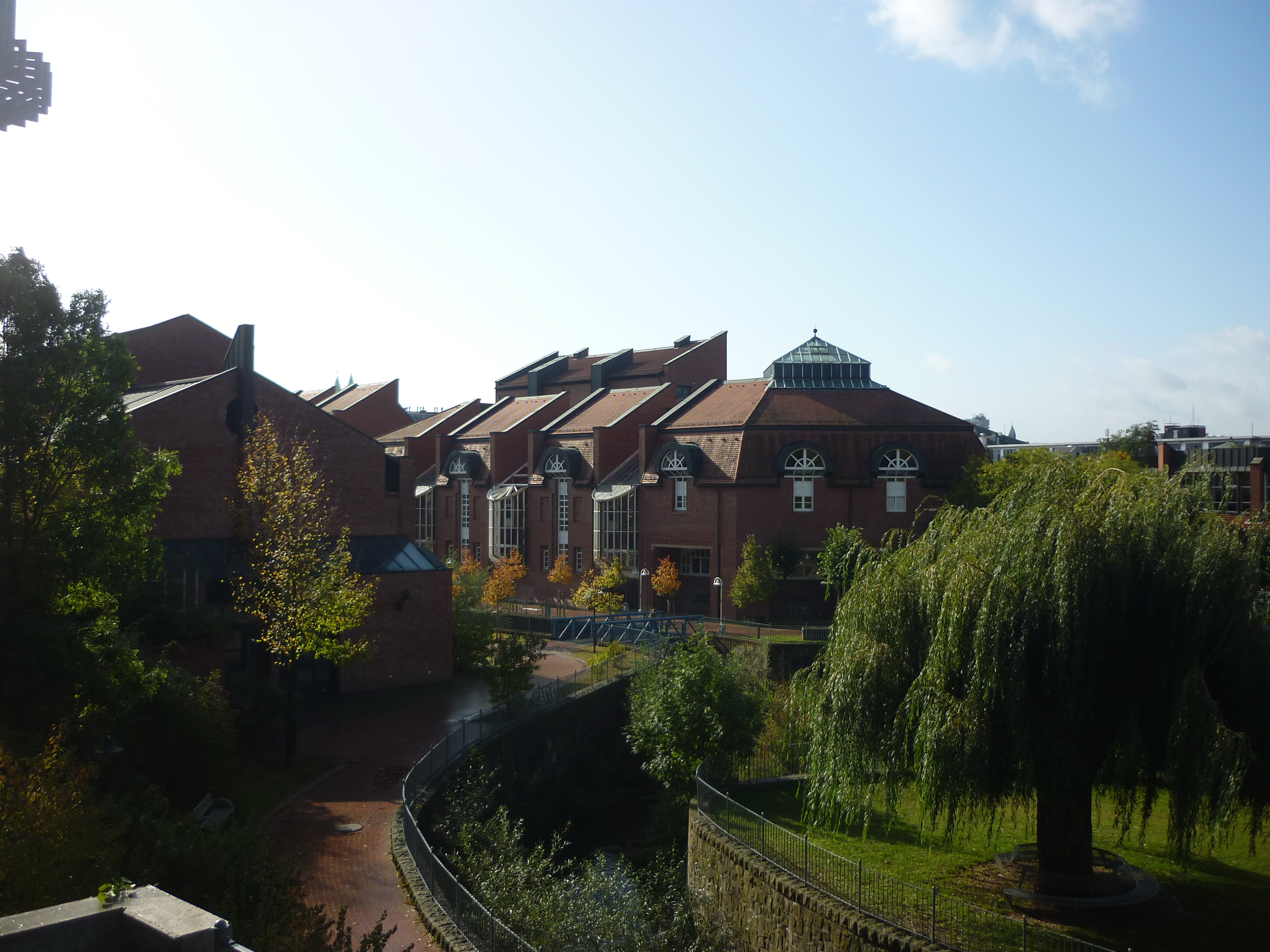
- University of Kassel
- Type: Short course program
- Established: 2001
- Location: Kassel, Germany
- Website: http://www.uni-kassel.de/isu/

The International Summer University is a short-term program that is held during the summer season by the University of Kassel every year. In addition to the international master programs, University Kassel organizes the ISU as one of its internationalization strategies.

The program of the ISU is designed for university students as well as researchers and professionals who want to learn more about German and European perspectives in Environmental Sciences and German Language & Culture. Environmental science has been one of the strengths of Uni Kassel since its foundation in 1971. During the winter season the University Kassel offers the International Winter University (IWU) Kassel. The theme "sustainability" covers not only the academic content of the ISU/IWU, but also the program design which encourages continuous learning within and outside classrooms.

== History and development of the programme ==
The International Summer University started as one of the Hessen International Summer Universities that have been designed to attract international students to Hessen. Established in 2001, ISU offers short-term credit-bearing academic program featuring the strengths of University Kassel in the areas of Environmental Sciences and German Language & Culture studies. Apart from the academic components with specific foci, ISU is unique in its host-family program for students to experience first-hand German lifestyle. The University's long-standing partnerships with industries in the region and experiences in university-industry knowledge transfer also bring additional benefit to ISU students by giving them opportunities to witness the application of academic knowledge in industrial settings.

Since its inception, ISU has brought some 50 international students to Kassel every year. Some of these students returned to Kassel for further studies and many of them have become the ambassadors of the University and the city of Kassel in their home countries.

The uniqueness of ISU lies in the concern for the sustainability of global environment and cultural heritage. While ISU Kassel embraces globalization and innovation in the study program, the best practices of the program have been kept – arrangement of host families – to ensure that the visiting students are fully engaged in the local community and culture during their short stay in Kassel. Students are arranged to live with carefully selected host families and to practice their classroom knowledge with tandem partners and tutors. Workshops (e.g. German dancing, cooking, sports), field trips and excursions in Kassel and neighboring areas are also organized to introduce local culture and traditions to the students. Since the program is held during the term time, ISU students also have abundant opportunities to meet local students and participate in student activities on campus.

== Program of study ==
The study program of ISU includes German language courses which are designed to meet the criteria of the Common European Framework of Reference for Languages (European Language Portfolio) at the following levels: A1, B1 and C1. Students will study in small groups under the supervision of experienced teachers qualified in "'teaching German as a foreign language"'. Interactive and innovative teaching methods are characteristics of this German language course.

The seminars for the engineering module usually cover the following topics: adaptation strategies to climate change, earthquake engineering, environmental engineering, and integrated environmental science environmental science. Seminars for the German culture module usually covers topics such as history of Germany, German politics of the 20th century, intercultural communication, and German fairy tales. Students proficient in German language may choose the German-taught seminar of "Deutsche Geschichte und Politik im 20. Jahrhundert".

Students will be awarded 9 ECTS upon completion of the German language course and two academic seminars in either the engineering module or culture module. The seminars are taught by experienced faculty members in English and optionally in German. Students of the engineering module are arranged to visit industrial partners. Students from the cultural module are arranged to visit the museums and cultural establishments in Kassel.

== About Kassel and Uni Kassel ==
Kassel is a mid-sized city located in northern Hessen in the center of Germany. The city has around 198,500 inhabitants and a total area of 107 km2. Kassel is known as the "Capital of the German Fairy Tale Route" for it is the place where Jacob Grimm and Wilhelm Grimm spent more than 30 years of their lives to collect and compile the Grimm's Fairy Tales (German: Grimms Märchen) collection. Kassel is also the city of "documenta" where the world's largest exhibition of contemporary art takes place every five years.

In 1971, Uni Kassel was founded in the city of Kassel as a reform university. The University is one of the first universities to have developed an international and inter-disciplinary perspective in research and learning. Being the youngest public university in the state of Hessen, it has currently a student population of over 25,000, which includes some 3,200 international students from over 120 countries.
