= Kassel conversations =

Kassel conversations (German: Kasseler Gespräche) is the conventional name of an early medieval text preserved in a manuscript from around 810. It is held today in the university library of Kassel, Germany (Ms. 4° theol. 24). It contains several parts, among them an Exhortatio ad plebem christianam, an instructional theological text in Latin. The part that has been of most interest for modern scholarship is that of the so-called Kassel glosses, one of the earliest written documents of the Old High German language.

The Kassel glosses are a collection of words and short phrases translated from Latin to Old High German. They appear to have been meant as a practical tool to help speakers of Romance languages to learn Old High German.

Among them are everyday phrases such as orders given to servants ("shave my beard"), questions and answers for basic communication ("do you understand? No, I don't"), and a few fragmentary grammar paradigms ("I understand, you understood, we understood"). The most famous entry, however, is a jocular jibe in Latin and Old High German:

- Latin: Stulti sunt romani sapienti sunt paioari modica est sapientia in romana plus habent stultitia quam sapientia.
- Old High German: Tole sint uualha, spahe sint peigira; luzic ist spahe in uualhum mera hapent tolaheiti denne spahi.
- Translation: "Roman (uualha) people are stupid, Bavarians are smart; there is little smartness in the Romans; they have more stupidity than smartness."

The manuscript is written on 60 sheets of parchment. Based on the scribal hands and the forms of the Carolingian minuscule employed, it is believed that the text was written by two different scribes from the area of Regensburg c. 810. Parts of the text have a parallel in a second manuscript held in St. Gallen, Switzerland.

The manuscript came to Kassel from Fulda in 1632. It was mentioned for the first time by Johann Heinrich Hottinger in his work Historica ecclesiastica novi testamenti from 1637. The first scholarly study of the manuscript was done by Wilhelm Grimm in 1846. Grimm made the mistake of re-drawing the text with a modern ink to make the writing more legible. This has caused some permanent damage to the fragile material.

== See also ==
- University of Kassel
- Paris Conversations
