= International Winter University Kassel =

- Type: Short course program
- Established: 2005/06
- Location: Kassel, Germany
- Website: http://www.uni-kassel.de/iwu

International Winter University (IWU) Kassel is a short-term program that is held during the winter season by the University of Kassel every year. The IWU inspired from the international short-term programs held in Germany, then International Summer University (ISU) Kassel began the establishment of IWU in response to growing interest of international students to study in Germany. In addition to the international master programs, Uni Kassel organizes both of ISU and IWU as one of its internationalization strategies. The program of IWU Kassel is designed for university students as well as researchers and professionals who want to learn more about German and European perspectives in Environmental Sciences and German Language & Culture. Environmental science has been one of the strengths of Uni Kassel since its foundation in 1971.

The uniqueness of IWU lies in the concern for the sustainability of global environment and cultural heritage. While IWU Kassel embraces globalization and innovation in the study program, the best practices of the program has been kept – arrangement of host families – to ensure that the visiting students are fully engaged in the local community and culture during their short stay in Kassel. Students are arranged to live with carefully selected host families and to practice their classroom knowledge with tandem partners and tutors. Workshops (e.g. German dancing, cooking, sports), field trips and excursions in Kassel and neighboring areas are also organized to introduce local culture and traditions to the students. Since the program is held during the term time, IWU students also have abundant opportunities to meet local students and participate in student activities on campus. The theme "sustainability" does not only cover the academic content of IWU, but also the program design which encourages continuous learning within and outside classrooms.

== History and Development of the Programme ==
Following the success of ISU, the International Winter University (IWU) was established in 2005/06 to offer international students an alternative time frame to experience education in Germany. It is a pioneer of short-term winter programs in Germany and is one of the short-term programs bearing the DAAD Quality Seal.

Besides, IWU offers short-term credit-bearing academic program featuring the strengths of Uni Kassel in the areas of Environmental Sciences and German Language & Culture studies. Apart from the academic components with specific foci, IWU is unique in its host-family program for students to experience first-hand German lifestyle. The university's long-standing partnerships with industries in the region and experiences in university-industry knowledge transfer also bring additional benefit to IWU students by giving them opportunities to witness the application of academic knowledge in industrial settings.

Since its inception, IWU has received on average some 50 international students each year. The number of students is on the rise with its growing popularity among partnering universities. Some of these students returned to Kassel for further studies and many of them have become the ambassadors of the university and the city of Kassel in their home countries.

== Program of Study ==
The study program of IWU Kassel includes German language courses which are designed to meet the criteria of the Common European Framework of Reference for Languages (European Language Portfolio) at the following levels: A1, B1 and C1. Students will study in small groups under the supervision of experienced teachers qualified in teaching German as a foreign language. Interactive and innovative teaching methods are characteristics of this German language course.

The seminars for engineering module usually cover the following topics: an introduction to international climate policy, renewable energy and energy systems from a German and European perspective, environment protection measures, solar-thermal technologies and systems, photovoltaic, the history and future of wind energy, wind farm management, biomass, natural gas storage, and rational and efficient energy usage: low energy housing and sustainable building. Seminar for German culture module usually covers topics such as German history, literature, and art of the 19th and 20th centuries, which all activities will explore how contemporary German culture has been shaped by historical developments in the past 200 years, the "Age of Goethe" (Goethe-Zeit), the end of the 19th century (nietzsche), and the revolutionary art movement (bauhaus and expressionism).

Students will be awarded 6 ECTS upon completion of the German language course and two academic seminars in either the engineering module or culture module. The seminars are taught by experienced faculty members in English and optionally in German. Students of the engineering module are arranged to visit industrial partners. Students from the cultural module are arranged to visit the museums and cultural establishments in Kassel.

== About Kassel and Uni Kassel ==
Kassel is a mid-sized city located in northern Hesse in the centre of Germany. The city has around 198,500 inhabitants and a total area of 107 km2. Kassel is known as the "Capital of the German Fairy Tale Route" for it is the place where Jacob Grimm and Wilhelm Grimm spent more than 30 years of their lives to collect and compile the Grimm's Fairy Tales (German: Grimms Märchen) collection. Kassel is also the city of "documenta" where the world's largest exhibition of contemporary art takes place every five years.

In 1971, Uni Kassel was founded in the city of Kassel as a reform university. The university is one of the first universities to have developed an international and inter-disciplinary perspective in research and learning. Being the youngest public university in the state of Hessen, it has currently a student population of over 25,000 which includes some 3,200 international students from over 120 countries.
