= Ulrike Tikvah Kissmann =

German sociologist

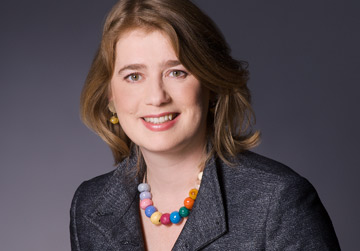
- Born: 19 November 1967 (age 58); Berlin, Germany
- Education: Technische Universität Berlin; University of Edinburgh
- Scientific career
- Fields: Sociology
- Workplaces: University of Kassel

Ulrike Tikvah Kissmann (born 19 November 1967) is a German sociologist.

== Life ==
Ulrike T. Kissmann completed her Abitur and Baccalauréat in 1986 and joined the classe préparatoire at the Lycée La Bruyère in Versailles to study Philosophy and Classical Philology at the École Normale Supérieure de Sèvres-Ulm. From 1987 to 1993, she completed a double degree program in Physics and Philosophy at Technische Universität Berlin (diploma in Physics and MA in philosophy). She was awarded the Erwin-Stephan-Preis by the TU Berlin for her degree. From 1993 to 1994, she successfully completed a postgraduate degree in Science and Technology Studies at the University of Edinburgh. She earned her doctorate in 2001 under Wolfram Fischer-Rosenthal at the University of Kassel (second supervisor was Andreas Knie). Her dissertation on Kernenergie und deutsche Biographien. Die Gegenwärtigkeit des Nationalsozialismus in biographischen Rekonstruktionen von Kerntechnik-Experten (Nuclear Technology and German Biographies: The Presence of National Socialism in Biographical Reconstructions of Nuclear Experts) was published by Psychosozial-Verlag.

From 2006 until 2011, she was junior research group leader of the DFG project Zum Wandel von Arbeit durch computerisiertes Wissen im Operationssaal aus der Geschlechterperspektive (The Effect of Computerized Knowledge in the Operating Room from a Gender Perspective), which Kissmann acquired independently. In 2013, she completed her habilitation at the Philosophical Faculty III of Humboldt University in Berlin, receiving a Venia Legendi in Sociology. Klaus Eder and Hubert Knoblauch were the reviewers of her habilitation thesis entitled Die Sozialität des Visuellen. Fundierung der hermeneutischen Videoanalyse und materiale Untersuchungen (The Sociality of the Visual. The Establishment of Video Hermeneutics and Material Analyses). The monograph was published in 2014 by Velbrück Wissenschaft. From the winter semester 2012/13 until the end of the winter semester 2014/15, Kissmann was interim professor of Process-Oriented Sociology at the Catholic University of Eichstätt-Ingolstadt. In March 2015, she was appointed full Professor for Sociological Methodology of Qualitative Reconstructive Research at the University of Kassel.

== Research ==
Kissmann's research focuses on the interpretive paradigm of Alfred Schütz and its further development. With reference to Maurice Merleau-Ponty, she has made other forms of intentionality such as fleshly habituality fruitful for phenomenology, moving beyond the classic model of interaction with two human actors, limited to their content of consciousness. On this basis, Kissmann has developed a methodology and method for video hermeneutics that take into account the special content of visual-bodily behavior in natural situations. With her work, she brings Merleau-Ponty's phenomenology of the subjective body into hermeneutics of sociology of knowledge and expands the classic model of action.

As Director of the Center of Empirical Research Methods at the University of Kassel (2018–2024) she fostered qualitative research methods within empirical social research. And as vice-president and President of the Research Network 20, Qualitative Methods of the European Sociological Association (2019–2024) Kissmann contributed to the discussion on the state and future of qualitative methods.

== Selected works ==
- Kernenergie und deutsche Biographien: Die Gegenwärtigkeit des Nationalsozialismus in biographischen Rekonstruktionen von Kerntechnik-Experten. Gießen, Psychosozial, 2002, ISBN 3-89806-178-7.
- as editor: Video Interaction Analysis: Methods and Methodology. Frankfurt/M. et al., Peter Lang, 2009, ISBN 978-3-631-57473-7.
- Die Sozialität des Visuellen: Fundierung der hermeneutischen Videoanalyse und materiale Untersuchungen. Weilerswist, Velbrück Wissenschaft, 2014, ISBN 978-3-942393-83-6.
- as editor with Jost van Loon:Discussing New Materialism: Methodological Implications for the Study of Materialities.Wiesbaden, Wiesbaden, Springer, 2019, ISBN 978-3-658-22299-4.
