= Paul-Gerhard Klumbies =

German Protestant theologian

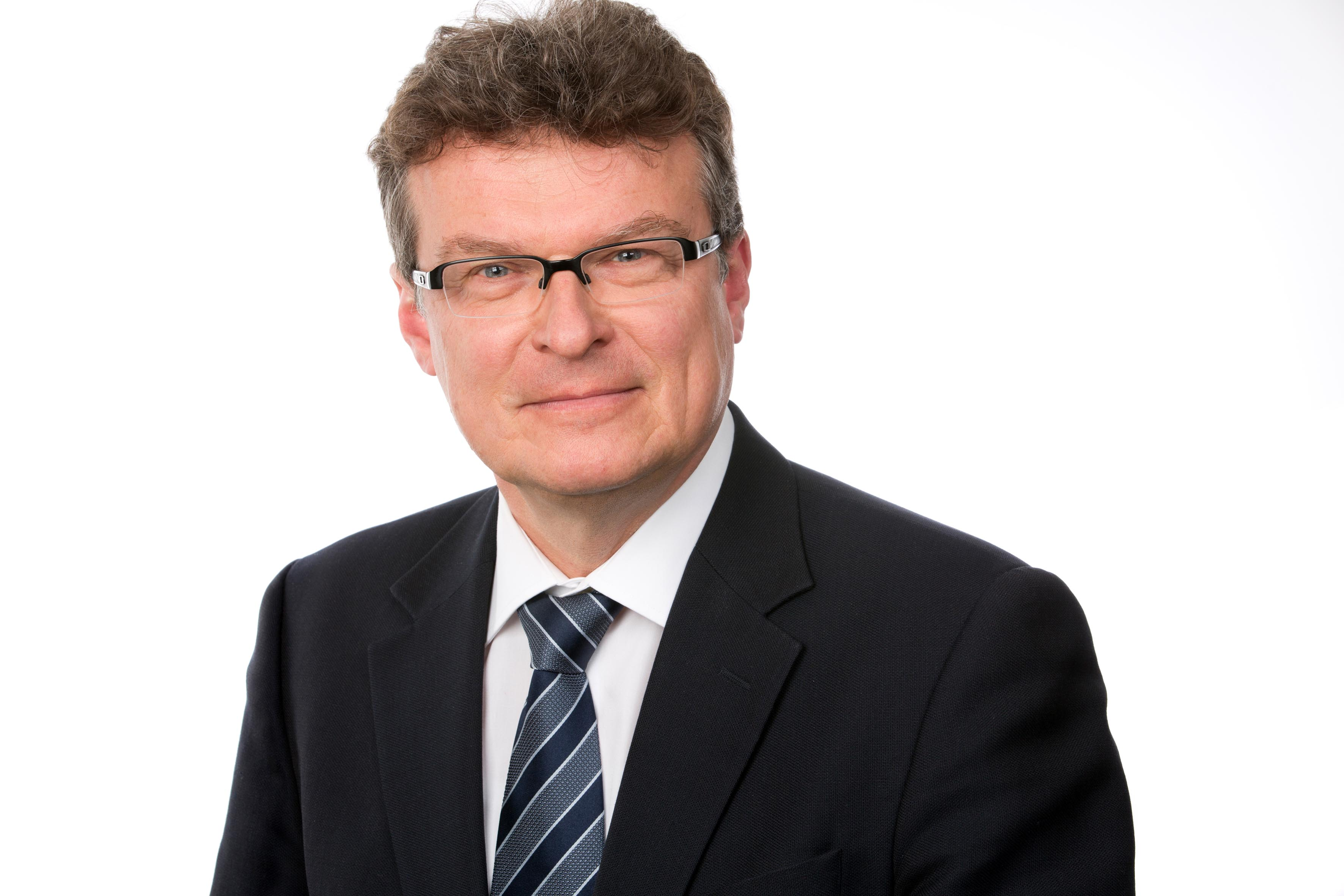
- Paul-Gerhard Klumbies (2015)
- Born: 14 August 1957 (age 69); Bad Pyrmont
- Occupations: German Protestant theologian and New Testament scholar
- Title: Professor of Biblical Sciences

Academic background
- Education: Kirchliche Hochschule Bethel
- Thesis: Der Mythos bei Markus (1988)

Academic work
- Discipline: New Testament scholar

Paul-Gerhard Klumbies (born 14 August 1957) is a German Protestant theologian and New Testament scholar.

== Education and academic career ==
Klumbies studied from 1976 Protestant theology first in Bethel, then Erlangen, Hamburg and Münster. He completed his theological qualifications in 1982 and 1984 at the Lippische Landeskirche in Detmold. From 1984 to 1988 he was a scientific assistant in the field of New Testament at the Kirchliche Hochschule Bethel, where he was awarded his Ph.D. in 1988. From 1988 to 1993 he was parish vicar and parish pastor in Bad Salzuflen.

From 1993 to 2004 he was Professor of Protestant Theology with a focus on New Testament and Diaconal Studies at the Evangelical University of Applied Sciences Freiburg. In 2000 he lectured in New Testament at the Department of Protestant Theology at the University of Hamburg.

Since 2004 he has served as Professor of Biblical Sciences with particular interest in the New Testament at the University of Kassel. He works in the Department of Humanities and Cultural Studies as part of the Institute of Protestant Theology.

== Contributions ==
Klumbies 1992 work Die Rede von Gott bei Paulus in ihrem zeitgeschichtlichen Kontext caught the attention of Larry W. Hurtado regarding his view of the Pauline theology. He sees Paul's theology as seen through the 'lens' of his understanding of who Jesus is, his Christology.

In his work of 2015 Herkunft und Horizont der Theologie des Neuen Testaments he drew attention to the need to recall the 'transcendence of God' in our remembering true theology is the purpose and not just a methodology.

== Personal life ==
Klumbies is married and has two children.

== Works ==
=== Books ===
- Klumbies, Paul-Gerhard (1992). Die Rede von Gott bei Paulus in ihrem zeitgeschichtlichen Kontext. FRLANT. Vol. 155. Göttingen: Vandenhoeck & Ruprecht. ISBN 9783525538364. OCLC 27342255.
- ——— (1998). Diakonie und moderne Lebenswelt : neutestamentliche Perspektiven. Karlsruhe: Verl. Evang. Presseverb. für Baden. ISBN 9783872103628. OCLC 75884350.
- ——— (1999). Studien zur paulinischen Theologie. Schriftenreihe der Evangelischen Fachhochschule Freiburg. Vol. 8. Münster: Lit Verlag. ISBN 9783825844158. OCLC 49774804.
- ——— (2001). Der Mythos bei Markus. Beihefte zur Zeitschrift für die neutestamentliche Wissenschaft und die Kunde der älteren Kirche. Vol. 108. Berlin & New York: De Gruyter. ISBN 9783110171204. OCLC 48234211.
- ——— (2010). Von der Hinrichtung zur Himmelfahrt: der Schluss der Jesuserzählung nach Markus und Lukas. Biblisch-theologische Studien. Vol. 114. Neukirchen-Vluyn: Neukirchener Verlagsgesellschaft. ISBN 9783788724603. OCLC 682880717.
- ——— (2015). Herkunft und Horizont der Theologie des Neuen Testaments. Tübingen: Mohr Siebeck. ISBN 9783161531606. OCLC 902617073.

=== As editor ===
- ———; Baumgartner, Ingrid; Sick, Franziska, eds. (2009). Raumkonzepte: disziplinäre Zugänge. Göttingen: V & R Unipress. ISBN 9783899716948. OCLC 928973090.
- ———; Leuzinger-Bohleber, Marianne, eds. (2010). Religion und Fanatismus psychoanalytische und theologische Zugänge; mit 1 Tabelle. Schriften des Sigmund-Freud-Instituts. Vol. 2. Göttingen: Vandenhoeck & Ruprecht. ISBN 9783525451847. OCLC 845655485.
- ———; du Toit, David S., eds. (2013). Paulus - Werk und Wirkung: Festschrift für Andreas Lindemann zum 70. Geburtstag. Tübingen: Mohr Siebeck, 2013. ISBN 9783161525803. OCLC 865469802.
- ———; Müllner, Ilse, eds. (2016). Bibel und Kultur : Das Buch der Bücher in Literatur, Musik und Film. Leipzig: Evangelische Verlagsanstalt. ISBN 9783374046362. OCLC 972289425.
