= Journal of the Association for Information Systems =

- Discipline: Information systems
- Language: English
- Edited by: Monideepa Tarafdar

Publication details
- History: 2000–present
- Publisher: Association for Information Systems
- Frequency: Bimonthly
- Impact factor: 3.103 (2018)

Standard abbreviations
- ISO 4: J. Assoc. Inf. Syst.

Indexing
- ISSN: 1536-9323
- OCLC no.: 818904844

Links
- Journal homepage; Online archive

The Journal of the Association for Information Systems (JAIS) is a top-tier peer-reviewed scientific journal that covers research in the areas of information systems and technology. It is an official journal of the Association for Information Systems and published electronically. The journal was established in 2000 and is abstracted and indexed in Science Citation Index Expanded, Social Sciences Citation Index, and Current Contents/Social & Behavioral Sciences. According to the Journal Citation Reports, the journal has a 2018 impact factor of 3.103.

== Editors-in-chief ==
The following persons have been editors-in-chief of the journal:

- Phillip Ein-Dor, Tel Aviv University (2000-2002)
- Sirkka Jarvenpaa, University of Texas at Austin (2002-2005)
- Kalle Lyytinen, Case Western Reserve University (2005-2010)
- Shirley Gregor, Australian National University (2010-2013)
- Suprateek Sarker, University of Virginia (2013–2019)
- Dorothy E. Leidner, University of Virginia (2019–2024)
- Monideepa Tarafdar, University of Massachusetts Amherst (2024–present)

== See also ==
- Management Information Systems Quarterly
- Information Systems Research
- Journal of Management Information Systems
- Journal of Information Technology
