= Ines Mergel =

German public administration professor

Personal details
- Born: Ines Mergel Hannover, Germany
- Education: University of Kassel; University of St. Gallen
- Profession: Academic; Social Media Wiz

Ines Mergel is a full professor of public administration in the department of politics and public administration at the University of Konstanz, Germany. She was previously on the public administration faculty at The Maxwell School of Citizenship and Public Affairs of Syracuse University, where she earned tenure as an associate professor of public administration and international affairs. Mergel is an expert in social media and teaches courses in agile government, digital government, and social media in the public sector.

A native of Germany, Mergel received a BA and MBA equivalent in business economics from the University of Kassel, Germany. She received a Doctor of Business Administration (DBA) in information management from the University of St. Gallen in Switzerland and spent six years as doctoral and postdoctoral fellow at Harvard's Kennedy School of Government, where she conducted research on public managers’ informal social networks and their use of technology to share knowledge." In 2018, Mergel was elected as a fellow of the National Academy of Public Administration.

== Career ==
Mergel is a full professor of public administration in the department of politics and public administration at the University of Konstanz, Germany. She was formerly at Syracuse University's Maxwell School of Citizenship and Public Affairs and affiliate professor at the iSchool of Syracuse University, and a post-doctorate fellow with the faculty affiliate program on networked governance at Harvard's Kennedy School.

Her research focuses on new technology adoption in bureaucratic and hierarchical structures in the public sector. Her research is published in academic journals, such as Public Administration Review, American Review of Public Administration, Journal of Public Administration Research and Theory (JPART), Public Management Review, and practitioner-oriented outlets, such as IBM's Center for the Business of Government reports.

== Publications ==
Dr. Mergel has co-authored and published articles and books on technology adoption in the legislative and executive branches of the U.S. government.

Her book Social Media in the Public Sector is based on interviews with social media directors in the U.S. federal government and present the findings of a longitudinal study of how federal agencies have embraced the Presidential call to use new technologies to make government more transparent, participatory and collaborative. For her second book she teamed up with Bill Greeves, CIO of Wake County, and wrote a fieldguide for public managers to implement social media: Social Media in the Public Sector Field Guide: Designing and Implementing Strategies and Policies.
