= Jan Marco Leimeister =

German professor of business information systems

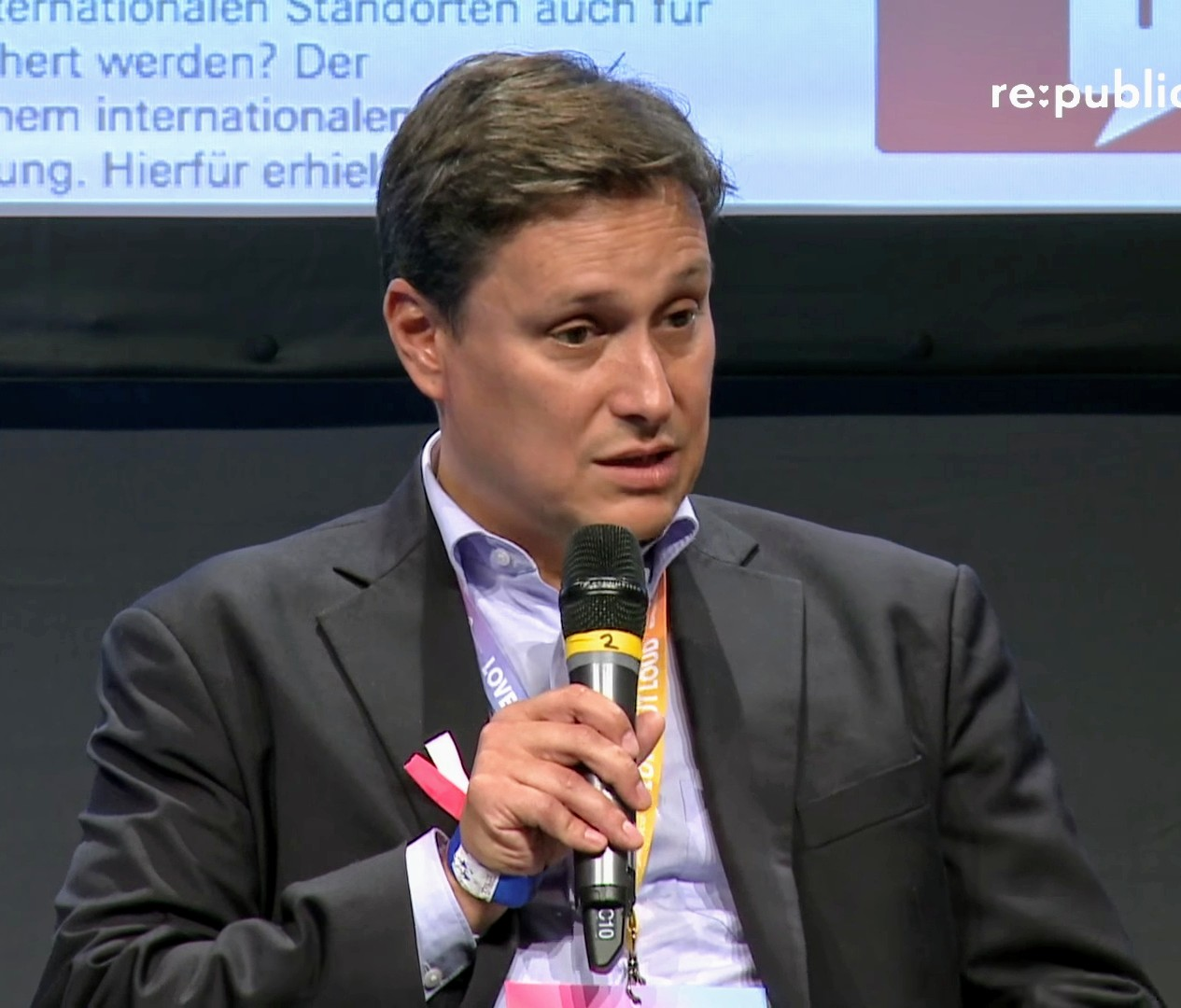
Jan Marco Leimeister in 2017

Jan Marco Leimeister (born April 7, 1974) is a German university professor for business information systems from Bietigheim-Bissingen. He is a tenured professor of business information systems and director at the Institute of Information Management (IWI HSG). at the University of St. Gallen as well as head of the Department of Information Systems and director at the Research Center for Information System Design (ITeG) at the University of Kassel.

== Role in the business information systems community ==
Leimeister took over several functions at research conferences in (business) information systems. For instance, he performed the function of a program chair at the European Conference on Information Systems (ECIS) 2014, as co-conference chair of the conference Wirtschaftsinformatik (WI) 2017 in St. Gallen, or as a Program Chair at the International Conference on Information Systems (ICIS) 2019. He is furthermore a member of committees of various information systems A-journals, for example associate editor of the European Journal of Information Systems (EJIS), senior editor of the Journal of Information Technology (JIT), and member of the editorial board of the Journal of Management Information Systems (JMIS).

== Awards and recognitions ==
In a ranking of the renowned German business magazine Wirtschaftswoche from 2019, Leimeister was ranked among 2,824 business researchers from Germany, Austria and Switzerland on number 4 with regard to the research publication performance in journals within the years 2014 to 2018 and on number 8 with regard to his whole life research publication performance so far.

On September 3, 2018, Leimeister consulted as renowned expert in the field of crowdsourcing and digital work the German Federal Government (including chancellor Angela Merkel) in the “future talk” at Meseberg Castle (near Berlin)

For his research performance, he has been furthermore awarded in 2010 with the TUM Research Excellence Award in the field of innovation and leadership. For his teaching performance, he was awarded in 2009 the 3. Hesse University Prize for Excellence in teaching. The Association for Information Systems (AIS), the leading international professional association in information systems, conferred him the AIS Award for Innovation in Teaching in 2016.
