= Hans-Jürgen Burchardt =

German economist and social scientist

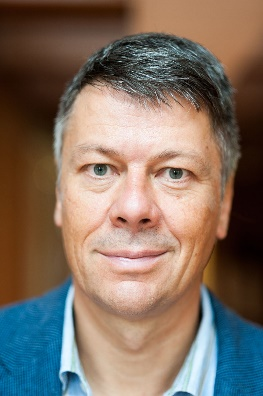
Hans-Jürgen Burchardt, 2019

Hans-Jürgen Burchardt (born 1962, Hanover) is a German economist and social scientist. Since 2005 he is Full Professor of International and Intersocietal Relations at the University of Kassel. His main areas of teaching and research include North-South-Relations, commodity-, environmental and social regimes in an international perspective, SDGs, social inequality and wealth research, theory and politics of development and Latin America.

== Career and research ==
Between 1988 and 1996 Burchardt studied social science and economics at the universities of Freiburg, Havana and Bremen completing both diplomas with distinction. After he received his PhD 1997 in Bremen he worked as a lecturer at the University of Hannover, where he supervised several research projects and obtaining his habilitation (second PhD) in 2001 with a thesis on international social politics. Apart from several consulting activities (e.g. for the European Initiative for Democracy and Human Rights or the German Federal Ministry of Education and Research) Burchardt was in charge of a research project at the German Institute of Global and Area Studies(GIGA). Between 2004 and 2005 he was Professor of Political Science and head of the International Studies Program in Political Management at the University of Applied Sciences in Bremen. Since 2007 he is spokesman of the international graduate program Global Social Policies and Governance (GSP&G). From 2009 to 2015 he was a member of the board of directors of the International Center for Development and Decent Work (ICDD).

As a visiting professor, Burchardt taught and conducted research at the Institut Barcelona Estudis Internacionals (IBEI) at Rutgers University, at the Universidad de La Habana (UH) as well as at the Universidad Nacional de San Martin in Buenos Aires (UNSAM).

As of 2017, Burchardt is director of CALAS - Maria Sibylla Merian Center for Advanced Latin American Studies and director of the Latin American Research Center Centro de Estudios Latinoamericanos (CELA) at the University of Kassel.

In addition, Burchardt is since 2021 project leader within the BMBF-funded research network extractivism.de and, together with Rachid Ouaissa and Hannes Warnecke-Berger, conducts research on commodity extractivism in Latin America and the Maghreb. Within the project, the constellations, (inter-) national crisis potentials as well as the possibilities for change and the durability of the development and social model of raw material export are being investigated.

== Major publications ==
- as ed. with Irene Lungo-Rodríguez: Wealth, Development and Social Inequalities in Latin America. Transdiciplinary Insights. Routledge, London 2024, ISBN 9781032473567.
- as ed. with Philip Fehling: Taxation and Inequality in Latin America: New Perspectives on Political Economy and Tax Regimes. Routledge, London 2023, ISBN 9781032373744.
- as ed. with Johanna Leinius: (Post-)colonial Archipelagos: Comparing the Legacies of Spanish Colonialism in Cuba, Puerto Rico and the Philippines. University of Michigan Press, Michigan 2022, ISBN 9780472902606.
- Das pandemische Manifest. Neun Schritte in eine zukunftsfähige Gesellschaft. Oekom, München 2021, ISBN 9783962383428.
- ed.: (Post)colonialismo a prueba, Cuba, Puerto Rico y las Filipinas desde una perspectiva comparada. Gedisa, Mexiko 2021, ISBN 978-84-18525-65-0. [Full text]
- with Osnaide Izquierdo Quintana: Trabajo decente y Sociedad: Cuba bajo la óptica de los estudios sociolaborales comparada. Editorial UH, Havana 2017, ISBN 978-959-7251-20-0. [Full text]
- as ed. with Stefan Peters and Nico Weinmann: Entwicklungstheorie von heute – Entwicklungspolitik von morgen. Nomos, Baden-Baden 2017, ISBN 978-3-8487-2613-4.
- as ed. with Stefan Peters: Umwelt und Entwicklung in globaler Perspektive: Ressourcen – Konflikte – Degrowth. Campus Verlag, Frankfurt am Main 2017, ISBN 978-3-593-50512-1.
- with Rafael Domínguez, Carlos Larrea and Stefan Peters: Nada dura para siempre: Neo-extractivismo tras el boom de las materias primas. UASB-ICDD, Quito 2016, ISBN 978-9942-14-842-1. [Full text]
- with Stefan Peters: Der Staat in globaler Perspektive. Zur Renaissance der Entwicklungsstaaten. Campus-Verlag, Frankfurt am Main 2015, ISBN 978-3-593-50317-2.
- with Fernando Groisman: Desprotegidos y desiguales. ¿Hacia una nueva fisonomía social? Prometeo, Buenos Aires 2014, ISBN 987-574-662-2.
- with Olaf Kaltmeier and Rainer Öhlschläger: Urbane (T)Räume: Städte zwischen Kultur, Kommerz und Konflikt. Nomos, Baden-Baden 2014, ISBN 978-3-8487-1335-6.
- with Stefan Peters and Nico Weinmann: Arbeit in globaler Perspektive. Facetten informeller Beschäftigung. Campus Verlag, Frankfurt am Main 2013, ISBN 978-3-593-39964-5.
- with Elisabeth Tuider and Rainer Öhlschläger: Frauen (und) Macht in Lateinamerika. Nomos, Baden-Baden 2013, ISBN 978-3-8487-0758-4.
- with Kristina Dietz and Rainer Öhlschläger: Umwelt und Entwicklung im 21. Jahrhundert – Impulse und Analysen aus Lateinamerika. Nomos, Baden-Baden 2013, ISBN 978-3-8329-7977-5.
- with Anne Tittor and Nico Weinmann: Sozialpolitik in globaler Perspektive – Asien, Afrika und Lateinamerika. Campus Verlag, Frankfurt am Main 2012, ISBN 978-3-593-39780-1.
- with Ingrid Wehr: Soziale Ungleichheiten in Lateinamerika. Nomos, Baden-Baden 2011, ISBN 978-3-8329-6278-4.
- Tiempos de cambio - Repensar América Latina, Ediciones Böll, El Salvador 2007, ISBN 968-9084-02-X. [Full text]
- Nord-Süd-Beziehungen im Umbruch – Neue Perspektiven auf Staat und Demokratie in der Weltpolitik, Campus Verlag, Frankfurt am Main 2009, ISBN 978-3-593-39016-1.
- Zeitenwende - Politik nach dem Neoliberalismus. Schmetterling-Verlag, Stuttgart 2004, ISBN 3-89657-610-0.

== Sources ==
- Sponsorship by the German Academic Exchange Service
- The Heinrich Böll Foundation informs about its cooperation with the GSP&G (German)
- Interview with Hans-Jürgen Burchardt at Welt-Sichten (German)
- Interview published in the German nationwide newspaper Die Tageszeitung (German)
