= Paris Conversations =

11th-century Old-High-German-Latin phrasebook

The Paris Conversations, Pariser Gespräche, or Altdeutsche Gespräche ('Old German conversations') are an eleventh-century phrasebook for Romance-speakers (perhaps specifically Old French speakers) needing to communicate in spoken German. The text takes its name from the modern location of the sole surviving manuscript: according to Herbert Penzl, the text survives in the margins of a tenth-century manuscript of unrelated texts, Paris, Bibliothèque Nationale, MS. Lat. 7641 (with one leaf in Vatican Library MS. 566). The language is a colloquial north-western dialect of German, providing valuable evidence for everyday spoken German.

While in some ways a practical text useful to a cleric or aristocrat traveling in the German-speaking world, the text is also humorous, containing insults and envisaging scenarios like skipping church services to have sex.

== Sample text ==
An example of the text, giving the German, then the Latin, and then a modern English translation, runs as follows:

(51.) Gimer min ros. (da mihi meum equum.) ["Give me my horse."]

(52.) Gimer min schelt. ["Give me my shield."]
(53.) Gimer min spera. ["Give me my spear."]
(54.) Gimer min suarda. ["Give me my sword."]
(55.) Gimer min ansco. (guantos) ["Give me my gloves (Handschuhe)."]
(56.) Gimer min stap. (fustum) ["Give me my staff."]
(57.) Gimer min matzer. (cultellum) ["Give me my knife (Messer)."]

(58.) Gimer cherize. (candela) ["Give me (a) candle (Kerze)."]

== Editions ==
- Wilhelm Grimm, Kleinere Schriften (Berlin: Giitersloh, 1883), III, 473-513.
- E. Steinmeyer and E. Sievers, Die althochdeutschen Glossen, V, 517-24 (Berlin: Weidmann, 1879 ff.).
- W. Braune-E.A. Ebbinghaus, Althochdeutsches Lesebuch (Tübingen: Niemeyer, 1969), pp. 8-11.
- BNF catalogue record

== Studies ==
- W. Haubrichs, "Zur Herkunft der 'Altdeutschen (Pariser) Gespräche'," Zeitschrift für deutsches Altertum und deutsche Literatur, 101.1 (1st Quarter, 1972), pp. 86-103.
- F. Jolles, "The Hazards of Travel in Medieval Germany," German Life and Letters, 21 (1968), 309-19.
- R. Schützeichel, "Das westfränkische Problem," in Deutsche Wortforschung in europäischen Bezügen (Giessen: W. Schmitz, 1963), pp. 469-523
- Kershaw, Paul, "Laughter After Babel’s Fall: Misunderstanding and Miscommunication in the Ninth-century West," in Humour, History and Politics in Late Antiquity and the Early Middle Ages, ed. by Guy Halsall (Cambridge: Cambridge University Press, 2002), pp. 179–202.

== See also ==
- Kassel conversations
