= Journal of Strategic Information Systems =

- Discipline: Information systems
- Language: English
- Edited by: Bob Galliers

Publication details
- History: 1991-present
- Publisher: Elsevier
- Frequency: Quarterly
- Impact factor: 3.486 (2016)

Standard abbreviations
- ISO 4: J. Strateg. Inf. Syst.

Indexing
- CODEN: JSIYE3
- ISSN: 0963-8687
- LCCN: 92645897
- OCLC no.: 39189374

Links
- Journal homepage; Online archive

The Journal of Strategic Information Systems is a quarterly peer-reviewed academic journal covering management, business, and organizational issues associated with the use of information systems. It was established in December 1991 by Bob Galliers, the initial editor-in-chief, and is published by Elsevier. Subsequent Editors-in-Chief were Guy Gable (Queensland University of Technology, 2019-2021), Yolande E. Chan (Desautels Faculty of Management, McGill University; 2021-2025) and Benoit Aubert (HEC Montreal) and Rajiv Sabherwal (University of Arkansas), since July 1, 2025.

== Abstracting and indexing ==
The journal is abstracted and indexed in:

- Current Contents/Social & Behavioral Sciences
- INSPEC Computer and Control Abstracts
- Library and Information Science Abstracts
- Science Citation Index Expanded
- Social Sciences Citation Index
- PsycINFO
- Scopus

According to the Journal Citation Reports, the journal has a 2023 impact factor of 8.7.
