= Ulrich Kutschera =

German biology professor

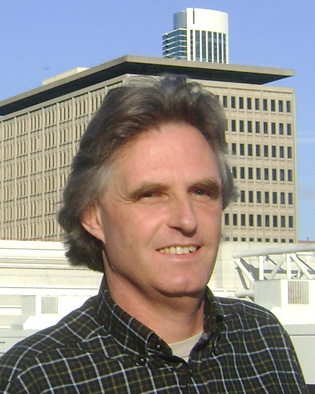
- Born: 2 February 1955 (age 71); Freiburg, West Germany
- Scientific career
- Fields: Physiology and evolution of bacteria, plants and animals; History and philosophy of biology

Ulrich Kutschera (born 2 February 1955) is a former German professor of biology who works as an academic advisor at I-Cultiver, Inc. in San Francisco and as a visiting scientist in Stanford/Palo Alto, California, US. He is the founder and head of "AK Evolutionbiologie", an association of evolutionary biologists in Germany. Starting in the 2000s, Kutschera started engaging with the public, first as a critic of creationism and intelligent design. Since the mid-2010s, his public statements and popular books focused on climate skepticism and criticism of gender studies.

== Education and career ==
Kutschera completed his undergraduate studies (biology/chemistry; theory of music) at the University of Freiburg, Germany, receiving a MS in zoology and evolutionary biology. In 1985, he received a doctorate degree (PhD) in plant physiology. His thesis (summa cum laude) was awarded the Pfizer Research Award (Germany) in 1986.

Between 1985 and 1988, Kutschera was the recipient of a Humboldt-fellowship (Feodor Lynen Program). He carried out his post-doctoral work at Stanford University (Department of Biology; Carnegie Institution for Science) and at Michigan State University (MSU-DOE Plant Research Laboratory). Kutschera was then employed at the University of Bonn as a research associate and thereafter as a lecturer. He began his professional career in 1993 at the Faculty of Biology and Chemistry (University of Kassel) as full professor and head of a department. In 2007, he joined the Research Groups of Z.-Y. Wang and Winslow R. Briggs in Stanford, California (US), as a visiting scientist. Since March 2021, Kutschera is a project manager at I-Cultiver, Inc.i in cooperation with Rajnish Khanna.

Kutschera is an elected member of the Alexander von Humboldt Foundation, Bonn, Germany, and the European Society for Evolutionary Biology (ESEB). In 2002, he became head of the Arbeitskreis (AK) Evolutionsbiologie (workgroup evolutionary biology) at the Verband Deutscher Biologen (vdbiol) (association of German biologists), and from 2004 to 2007 was vice president. In 2013, Kutschera was elected corresponding member of the Botanical Society of America (BSA), and, since 2015, he is a Scientific Advisor for the Agriculture-Food-Health Res. Comp. I-Cultiver Inc. based in San Francisco, California, USA, and the Systems Biology Group in Palo Alto, California, USA.

After leaving his position at the University of Kassel, he became a board member at the Desiderius-Erasmus-Stiftung, the foundation of Alternative for Germany. A statement accusing the gay community of child abuse and likening same-sex marriage to "state-sponsored pedophilia" drew widespread criticism and became subject of a trial for criminal slander, in which he was acquitted on appeal.

== Scientific work ==
Kutschera has studied the mechanism of phytohormone-mediated cell expansion (epidermal growth-control theory of stem elongation; protein secretion hypothesis of auxin action; epiphytic methylobacteria as phytosymbionts in living-fossil plants). His contributions to the taxonomy and molecular phylogeny of aquatic annelids (and methylobacteria) includes, for example, the discovery/description of the Golden Gate leech; he also revised the systematics of medicinal leeches and published a theory on the evolution of parental care in the Hirudinea.

Kutschera has written about evolution and creationism from historical and philosophical perspectives and the modern theory of biological evolution as an expanded synthesis, as well as the Synade-model of macroevolution. In 2008, Kutschera described the strict separation of scientific facts and theories from religious dogma in Charles Darwin's book On the Origin of Species (1859) as Darwin's philosophical imperative.

=== Evolution versus intelligent design ===
In 2003, Kutschera said,

"Anti-evolutionism in German-speaking countries has already infiltrated some academic circles."

In 2007, at the annual meeting of the American Association for the Advancement of Science (AAAS), in San Francisco, US, when speaking about the spread of creationism in Europe, Kutschera said,

"The more one argues against this creationist propaganda...the less you can convince people who are not scientists...[we should] no longer talk about Darwinism, but use the term Evolutionary Biology, which is a scientific discipline, like Physiology."

In 2015, at the AAAS-meeting in San Jose, US, Kutschera argued that

"The topic of evolution in Germany is in the hands of a small but powerful religious sect. But they are full of creationist nonsense."

Kutschera has defended evolution, human biology and naturalism against pseudoscientific claims.

=== Climate Skepticism ===
In 2019 Kutschera accused the School Strike for Climate of being motivated by laziness and naively falling pray to "climate ideology". While he does not deny climate change, he equivocates on anthropogemicism and considers the topic "hysteria", designed to "make the population more manageable".

=== Gender studies ===
In a series of interviews promoting and defending his book "The Gender-Paradox (2016)", Kutschera railed against Gender studies as a "cancerous growth trying to conquer science". He repeatedly asserted "overwhelming" scientific evidence that "men across all cultures prefer young, attractive, fertile, not particularly eloquent women, where he doesn't have to discuss much, and she cooks well and raises the children". The book itself criticized John Money (1921–2006) and his concepts of Gender-role etc. (english version of this text, see here). The book was generally panned by critics which was then criticized as attempted censorship. Dieter Schönecker wrote that "It is an intellectual catastrophe when contentious people like Ulrich Kutschera, Martin van Creveld, Jörg Baberowski or Rainer Wendt are no longer allowed to speak at a German university without the moral police from the 'imperium paternale' (Kant's term for paternal government) being sent out on patrol."

=== Homosexuality and pedophilia ===
In a 2017 interview with a catholic online magazine, Kutschera predicted that same-sex marriage, which was at the time in the process of legalization in Germany, would lead to "government-sanctioned pedophilia" and "extensive child abuse". Gay rights organizations and members of the community considered Kutschera's statements to be libelous. A first criminal trial in 2020 found Kutschera guilty of Volksverhetzung (incitement to hatred) and assessed a fine of 6,000 Euro. After Kutschera succeeded in appealing the verdict, the prosecution appealed and a third trial became necessary. The Oberlandesgericht in Frankfurt considered Kutschera's statements to be within the bounds protected by the principle of freedom of speech, leading to acquittal.

== Publications ==
Kutschera has published ca. 300 scientific papers, and 14 books (in German). Since 2010, he is the producer of a series of science videos for biology students, including the "post-Minimalist 'space music'" piano soundtrack.

His textbook, Evolutionsbiologie (2015) has been translated into Russian and Portuguese. In 2018, he published a critical analysis of the scientific validity of physiognomy, with reference to Darwin′s work on this topic.

In January 2019, Kutschera's textbook Physiologie der Pflanzen. Sensible Gewächse in Aktion was published. In a Book Review, Karl J. Niklas wrote that this volume, which provides a comprehensive summary of our current knowledge on the physiology and biochemistry of plants "… should be of value to general readers interested in the philosophy of science." A few weeks before the book became available, a religious webzine published an article dealing with "Plant Intelligence", a topic that was discussed in detail in Kutschera's textbook.
