= Journal of Information Technology =

Quarterly academic journal

- Discipline: Information systems
- Language: English
- Edited by: Daniel Schlagwein, Jan Marco Leimeister, Wendy Currie

Publication details
- History: 1986–present
- Publisher: SAGE Publishing
- Frequency: Quarterly
- Open access: Hybrid
- Impact factor: 5.8 (2023)

Standard abbreviations
- ISO 4: J. Inf. Technol.

Indexing
- ISSN: 0268-3962 (print); 1466-4437 (web)
- LCCN: 00238778
- OCLC no.: 643913068

Links
- Journal homepage; Online access; Online archive

The Journal of Information Technology is a quarterly peer-reviewed scientific journal that covers research on information systems, organisational management, and computer science. The editors-in-chief are Daniel Schlagwein, Jan Marco Leimeister, and Wendy Currie.

== Reception ==
According to the Journal Citation Reports, the journal has a 2023 impact factor of 5.8.

== See also ==
- MIS Quarterly
- Information Systems Research
- Information Systems Journal
