= University of Kassel =

University in Kassel, Germany

- Universität Kassel
- Type: Public
- Established: 1971
- Budget: € 353.7(2025) million
- Chancellor: Oliver Fromm
- President: Ute Clement
- Academic staff: 2,020(2025)
- Administrative staff: 1,386(2025)
- Students: 21,131(2025/26)
- Location: Kassel, Hessen, Germany; 51°19′22″N 9°30′27″E
- Colours: Ruby
- Website: www.uni-kassel.de
- Location within Germany Location within Hesse

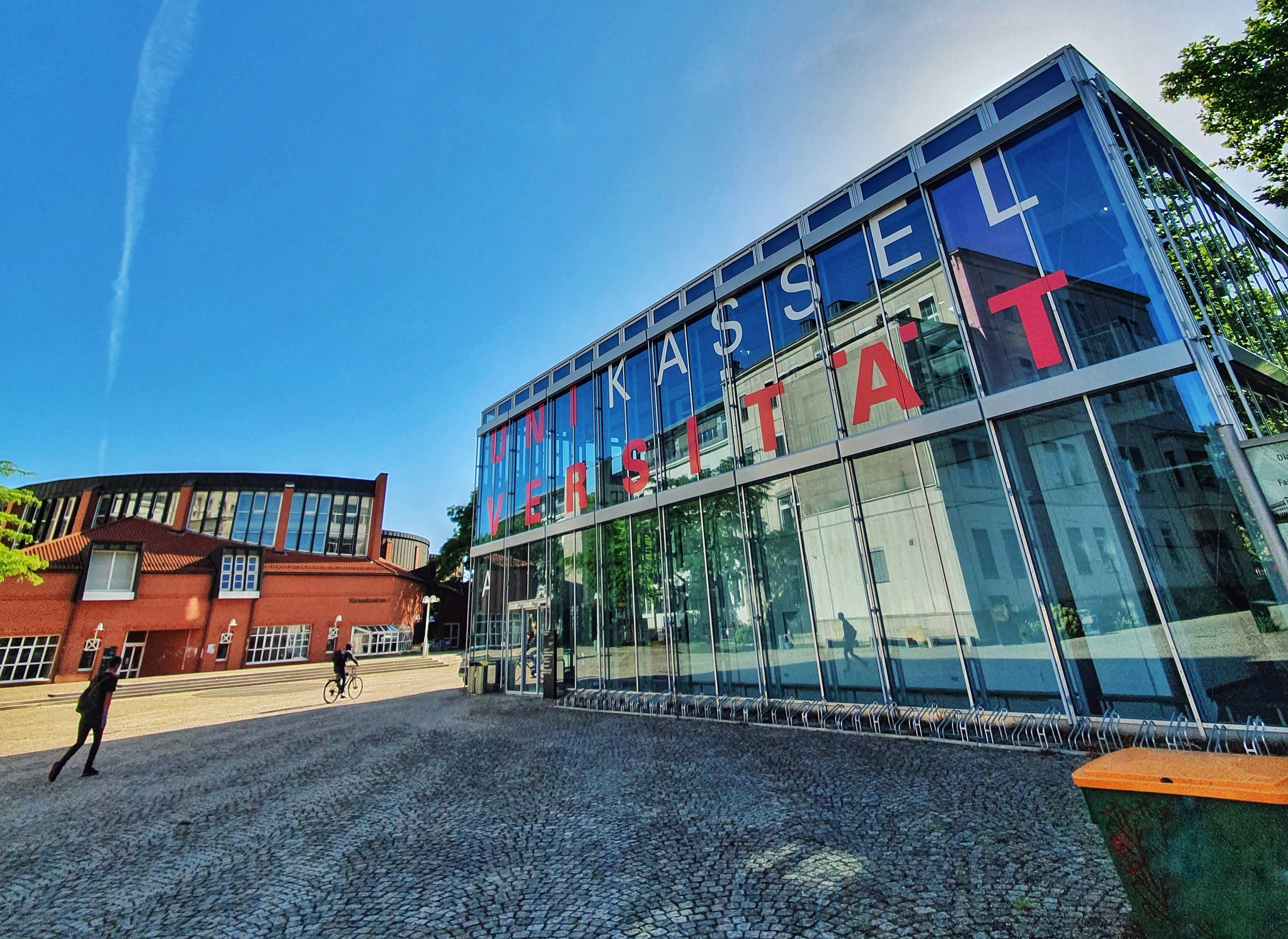
The university's entrance at its main campus Hollandischer Platz

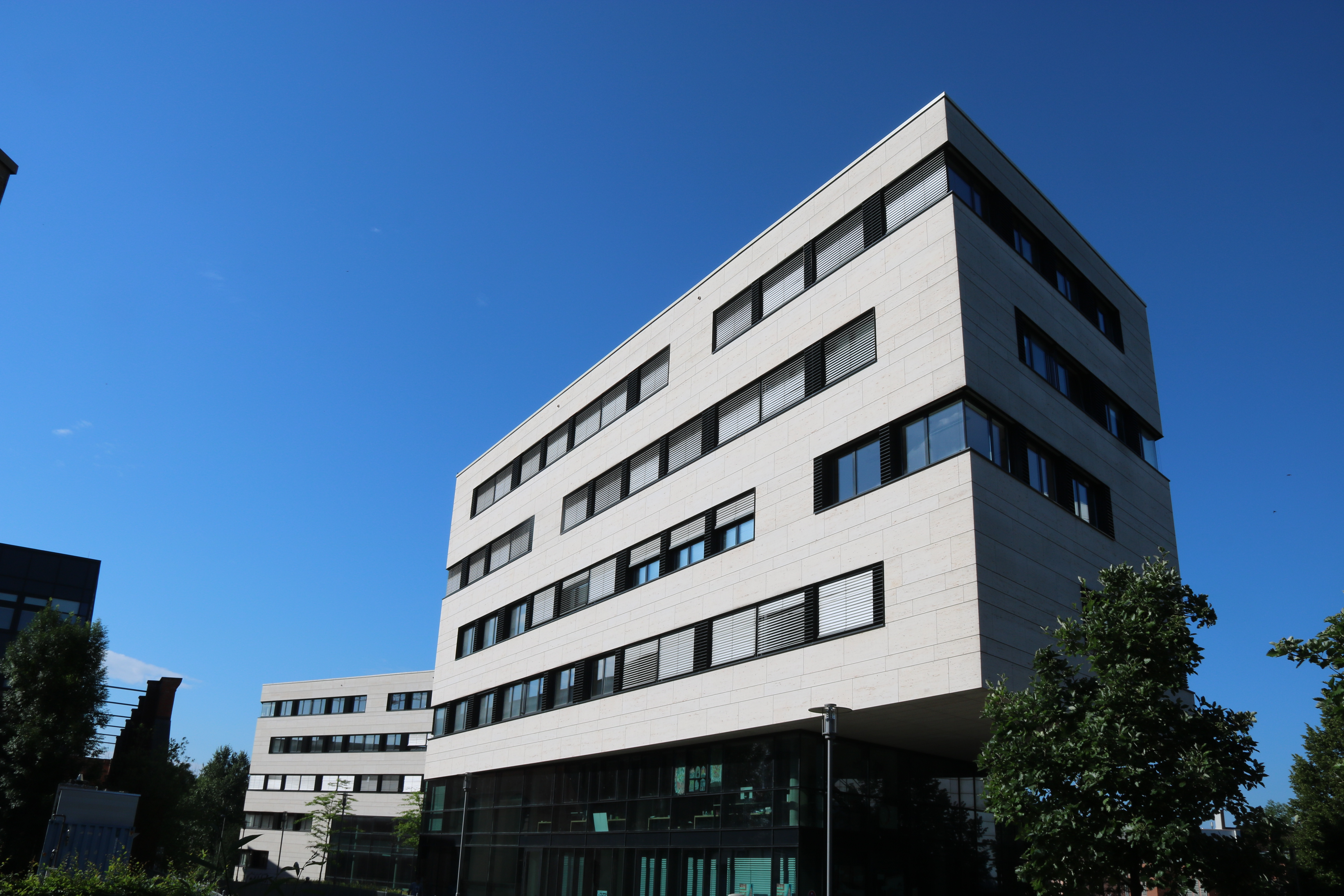
University of Kassel, Building of the Department of English Literature

The University of Kassel (German: Universität Kassel) is a university founded in 1971 located in Kassel, Hessen, in central Germany. As of June 2026 it had about 21,000 students and about 3400 staff, including more than 300 professors.

A special unit (Studienkolleg) prepares international students for their period of study (language and academic skills). International students come from over 115 countries.

Each academic year, more than 100 visiting scholars pursue research projects in cooperation with colleagues from the University of Kassel, making a valuable contribution to the academic and cultural life. The newly established International House is located on the campus. It offers hostels for international guests and is available for meetings, conferences, and cultural events.

== Precincts ==
In addition to the central campus Holländischer Platz, the University of Kassel has the other campuses Heinrich-Plett-Straße, Menzelstraße, Wilhelmshöher Allee and Damaschkestraße in Kassel as well as two campuses in the town of Witzenhausen (about 40 kilometres east).

== Schools ==
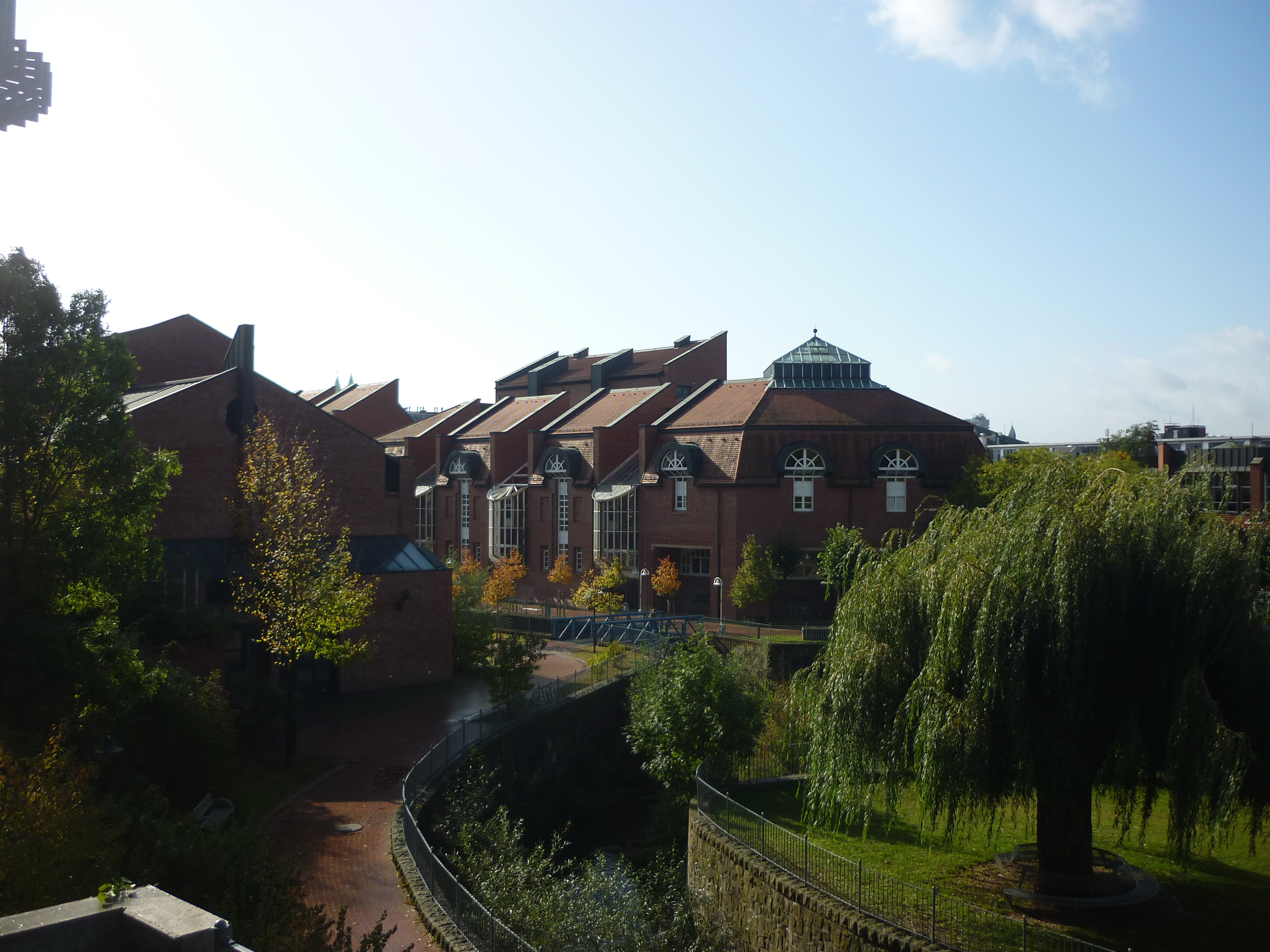
The central campus

A wide range of undergraduate and postgraduate study programmes is offered in the following fields of study. All study programmes are open to German and international students alike. A range of degrees can be obtained, including bachelor's and master's degrees, the Artistic Examination, or a Doctorate:

- Natural Sciences
- Engineering Sciences
- Architecture, Urban Planning and Landscape Planning
- International Agriculture and Environmental Protection
- Social Sciences
- Humanities
- Fine Arts

Two Academy Awards (or Oscar) in the area of animation films, plus three nominations, have so far been won by graduates from the Kassel School of Arts, which is part of the university.

== Research ==
Interdisciplinary research is a priority for the University of Kassel. This includes research cooperation and dialogue with international research institutions, such as the Fraunhofer Society. High-profile research includes new materials as well as sustainability. In order to strengthen the latter by adding new chairs, in 2021 the Kassel Institute of Sustainability was founded.

Research fields and cooperation projects also include the Brothers Grimm who spent their most productive years in Kassel and who wrote their famous fairy tales there, and the documenta, the world's most important exhibition of modern art, taking place in Kassel every five years.

Scientists at the Centre for Environmental Systems Research at the University of Kassel have been investigating how Germany can power itself entirely by renewable energy.

== Teaching ==
The University of Kassel has repeatedly been awarded for its teaching.

== Influence on regional economy ==
The region's economic revival of the last two decades has been widely attributed to the university and its encouragement of entrepreneurship. Germany's leading weekly paper Die Zeit called it a role model for universities nationwide.

== Library ==
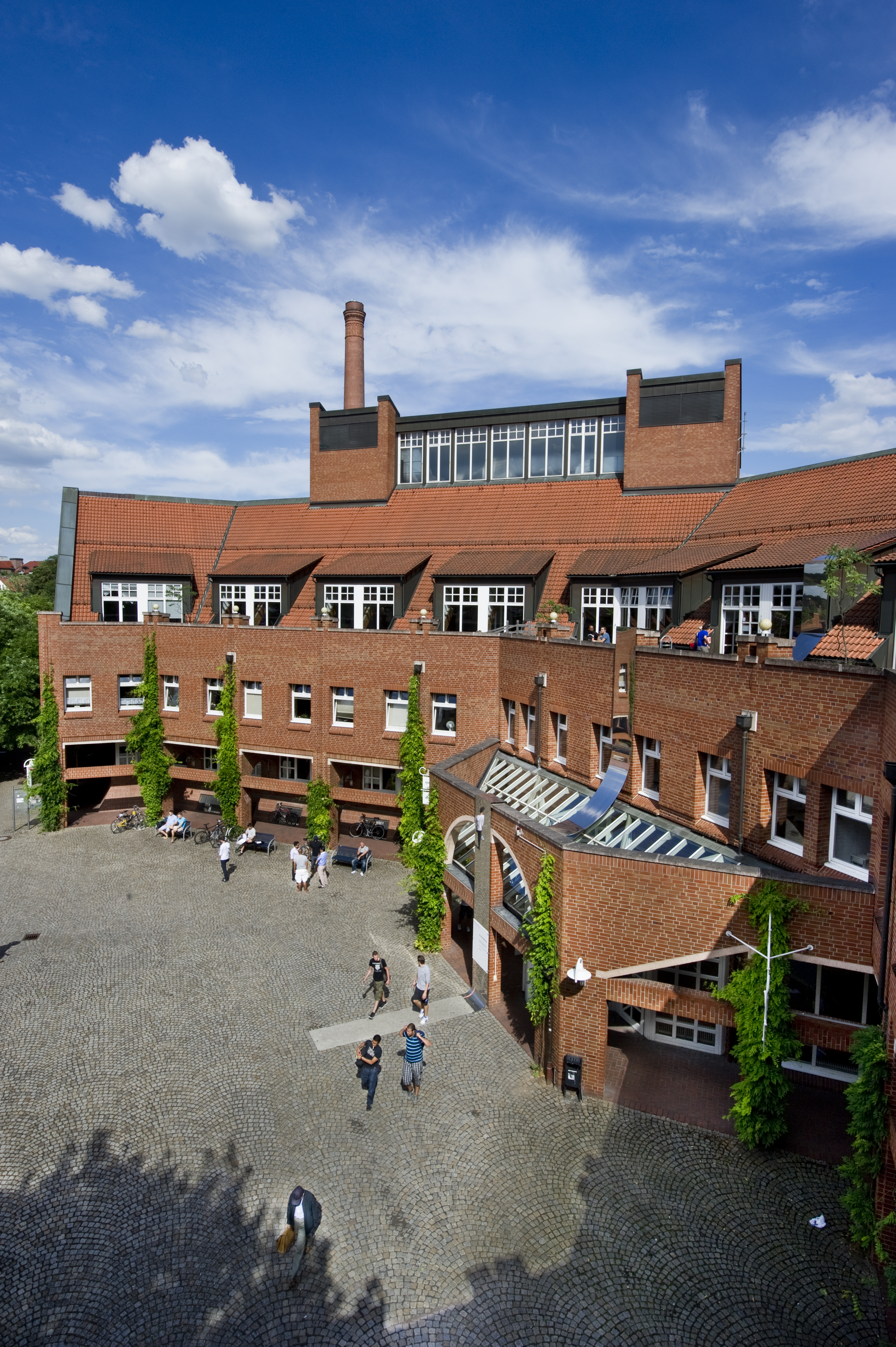
Central Library of Kassel University

The library of the University of Kassel serves as a Library of the State of Hessen (an important function in the German system of libraries). It was formed by merging the Landesbibliothek (founded 1580 be Landgraf Wilhelm IV of Hessen) and the Murhardsche Bibliothek (founded 1845 by the testament of scholar Friedrich Wilhelm August Murhard and his brother Friedrich Wilhelm August Murhard and opened 1905 as a city library).

A special focus of the library is the collection of early medieval manuscripts (over 10,000 in the collection) and early prints (mainly from the personal library of the Landgrafen, who devoted themselves to natural history, natural philosophy, astronomy, astrology, and alchemy). A few of the most important items have been digitized.

The two most impressive items of the collection are the Hildebrandslied (from c. 830) and the proof copy of the Children's and Household Tales, the famous fairy tales of the Brothers Grimm (the Kinder – und Hausmärchen der Gebrüder Grimm) (1812/1815), an annotated copy that was chosen as part of the UNESCO Memory of the World in 2005.

The library holds an early medieval text preserved in a manuscript from c. 810 known as the Kassel conversations (in German: Kasseler Gespräche).

== Notable people ==
=== Scholars ===
- Volker Braun – Grimm Professor
- Heinz Bude – Professor of Sociology
- Helmut Otto Hofer – Professor of Zoology
- Dieter Kienast – Professor of landscape architecture
- Ulrike Tikvah Kissmann – Sociologist
- Paul-Gerhard Klumbies – Professor of Biblical Sciences
- Kristian Köchy – Professor of Bioethics
- Georg Krücken – Professor of Sociology and Higher Education Research
- Ulrich Kutschera – Professor of Evolutionary Biology
- Jan Marco Leimeister – Professor of Business informatics
- Winfried Nöth – Professor of Semiotics
- Petra Schmidt – voice
- Rudolf Schmitt – 19th century scholar
- Helmuth Schneider – Professor of Ancient History
- Alexander Roßnagel – Professor of law with focus on privacy protection and digital economy
- Matthias Söllner – Professor of Business Informations
- Lutz Michael Wegner – Professor of Computer Science
- Christoph Scherrer – Professor of Globalization and Politics
- Aram Ziai – Professor of Development and Postcolonial Studies
- Hans-Jürgen Burchardt – Professor of International and Intersocietal Relations
- Sonja Buckel – Professor of Political Theory

=== Alumni ===
- Günther Cramer – Entrepreneur, SMA Technologie
- Thomas Stellmach (b. 1965) – Filmmaker and winner of the Academy Award for the animated motion picture Quest
- Klaus Stern (b. 1968) – Filmmaker and winner of the Adolf-Grimme-Preis for Weltmarktführer (2004), a documentary
- Ines Mergel – Expert in Social Media at The Maxwell School of Citizenship and Public Affairs at Syracuse University
- Matthias Berninger – Former member of Bundestag for Die Grünen
- Jürgen Osterhammel – German historian specializing in Chinese and world history, Professor emeritus at the University of Konstanz
- Maja Göpel – German political economist, transformation researcher, and sustainability scientist
- Gülay Çağlar – Professor of Political Science, Berlin Free University
- Kaya Kinkel – politician from Alliance 90/The Greens.
- George Lasry - computer scientist and cryptanalyst.
- Bernd Upmeyer – architect, urbanist and editor-in-chief of the magazine MONU
- Gerhard Lang – German visual artist, participant in documenta 14

== See also ==
- Kassel conversations
- List of early modern universities in Europe
- International Summer University (ISU) Kassel
- International Winter University (IWU) Kassel
