= Journal of Management Information Systems =

- Discipline: Information Systems
- Language: English
- Edited by: Vladimir Zwass

Publication details
- History: 1984-present
- Publisher: Taylor & Francis (United States)
- Frequency: Quarterly
- Impact factor: 7.838 (2020)

Standard abbreviations
- ISO 4: J. Manag. Inf. Syst.

Indexing
- CODEN: JMISEB
- ISSN: 0742-1222
- LCCN: 96091378
- OCLC no.: 986542950

Links
- Journal homepage

The journal of Management Information Systems (JMIS) is a peer-reviewed academic journal covering research in information systems and information technology. Established in 1984, the journal is published by Taylor & Francis in print and online. The editor-in-chief is Vladimir Zwass.

JMIS is ranked as one of the three top-tier Information Systems journals, along with Information Systems Research (ISR) and MIS Quarterly (MISQ), in the comprehensive scientometric study published in MISQ and confirmed by other scholarly studies. JMIS is one of the 50 leading scholarly journals on Financial Times FT50 list.

JMIS serves the researchers investigating new modes of information technology deployment and the changing landscape of information policy making, as well as practitioners and executives managing the information resource. Along with the pursuit of knowledge, the quarterly aims to serve the societal goals, and to bridge the gap between theory and practice of information systems.

The journal accepts for the double-blind review full-scale research submissions that make a significant contribution to the field of information systems. Such contributions may include:

- Impactful and methodologically sound empirical and theoretical work leading to the progress of the IS knowledge field
- Paradigmatic and generalizable designs and applications
- Analyses of informational policy making in an organizational, national, or international setting
- Investigations of societal and economic issues of organizational computing, in particular aiming at the improvements in health, sustainability, and equity

Analytical attention is focused on the following key issues:

- Information systems for competitive positioning
- Business processes and management enabled by information technology
- Business value of information technology
- Resilience and security of information-technology infrastructures
- Entrepreneurial deployment of information technology
- Management of information resources
- Relationship between information technology and organizational performance and structures
- Enterprise-wide systems architectures and infrastructures
- Electronic business, net-enabled organizations, and platforms
- The organization and impacts of big data and data analytics
- Artificial intelligence with machine learning in organizational information systems
- Social media, social commerce, and social networks in the organizational perspective
- Systems sourcing, development, and stewardship in organizations
- Informational support of collaborative work and co-creation
- Knowledge management, organizational learning, and organizational memory
- The human element in organizational computing

The submissions are refereed in a double-blind process by the internationally recognized referees and by Associate Editors who serve on the Editorial Board of JMIS. JMIS reviews have been ranked #1 in 2020 for quality and timeliness by the IS scholarly community.

== Critics ==
This journal's fairness and transparency in handling manuscripts have been criticized by some scholars. There have been comments on the academic journal review website, Scirev, stating that this journal rejected submissions without providing any explanation, simply stating that they were "not suitable". There were also comments mentioning that within the peer review feedback they received, some individuals claimed that this journal no longer publishes articles using the Partial Least Squares (PLS) method for data analysis. However, the journal's website has never addressed this issue, and the PLS method is used in many other top-tier journals. Even if there are concerns about the method, further explanation and decision-making should be provided instead of simply rejecting articles based on that reason.

== See also ==
- MIS Quarterly
- Information Systems Research
- Information Systems Journal
- Journal of Information Technology
