= Information Systems Journal =

- Discipline: Informatics
- Language: English
- Edited by: Robert M Davison

Publication details
- Former name(s): Journal of Information Systems
- History: 1991–present
- Publisher: Wiley-Blackwell
- Frequency: Bimonthly
- Impact factor: 4.267 (2017)

Standard abbreviations
- ISO 4: Inf. Syst. J.

Indexing
- CODEN: ISYJER
- ISSN: 1350-1917 (print); 1365-2575 (web)
- LCCN: 94648195
- OCLC no.: 46544344

Links
- Journal homepage; Online access; Online archive

Information Systems Journal is a bimonthly peer-reviewed scientific journal that covers all aspects of information systems, with particular emphasis on the relationship between information systems and people, business, and organisations. The journal was established in 1991 as Journal of Information Systems with David Avison and Guy Fitzgerald as founding editors-in-chief. It obtained its current name in 1994. The current editor-in-chief is Robert M Davison. The journal is member of the Senior Scholar's 'Basket of Eight'.

== Abstracting and indexing ==
The journal is abstracted and indexed in the Science Citation Index, ProQuest, CSA Computer Abstracts, Current Contents/Social & Behavioral Sciences, EBSCO databases, InfoTrac, Inspec, Psychological Abstracts/PsycINFO, Scopus, and the Social Sciences Citation Index. According to the Journal Citation Reports, the journal has a 2017 impact factor of 4.267, ranking it 6th out of 88 journals in the category "Information Science & Library Science".
