= Alok Gupta =

American information scientist and economic engineer

- Occupations: Information scientist, economic engineer, and academic
- Awards: Career Award, National Science Foundation; LEO Award, Association for Information Systems

Academic background
- Education: B.Tech; MS in Mine Electrical Systems; PhD in Management Science and Information Systems
- Alma mater: Banaras Hindu University; The Pennsylvania State University; The University of Texas at Austin
- Thesis: A Real-Time Priority Pricing Approach for Resource Allocation in Multi-Service Class Data Communication Networks (1996)
- Doctoral advisor: Andrew B. Whinston; Dale Stahl

Alok Gupta is an American information scientist, economic engineer, and academic. He is the Professor of Information and Decision, a Senior Associate Dean of Faculty, Research and Administration, and Curtis L. Carlson School Wide Chair in Information Management in the Carlson School of Management at the University of Minnesota.

Gupta's research interests include the impact of technology on business model, digital transformation, data-driven decision-making, and the design and adoption of emerging technologies. He is the recipient of the Career award by the National Science Foundation (NSF), and the LEO award by the Association for Information Science (AIS).

Gupta is a Fellow of the Association for Information Science and a Distinguished Fellow of INFORMS ISS. He has held several editorial appointments throughout his career, including serving as the Editor-in-Chief and Senior Editor of Information Systems Research. He also serves as an Associate Editor of the Brazilian Electronic Journal of Economics.

== Education ==
Gupta enrolled at Banaras Hindu University where he completed a Bachelor of Technology in Mining Engineering from its Indian Institute of Technology in 1988. He then completed his master's degree in Mine Electrical Systems from the Pennsylvania State University in 1991. Later, he earned a Ph.D. in Management Science and Information Systems from the University of Texas Austin in 1996 under the supervision of Andrew B. Whinston and Dale Stahl. His thesis was titled, "A Real-Time Priority Pricing Approach for Resource Allocation in Multi-Service Class Data Communication Networks".

== Career ==
Following his PhD Gupta began his academic career as a Visiting assistant professor in the Operations and Information Management Department at the University of Connecticut from 1996 to 1997 and became associate professor in 2001. He moved to the Carlson School of Management at the University of Minnesota in 2001 and was promoted to Professor in 2005. Since 2005 he has been a professor in the Information and Decision department at the University of Minnesota.

Gupta is the Publisher of MIS Quarterly and also holds an appointment as the Senior Associate Dean of Faculty in Research and Administration at the Carlson School of Management, the University of Minnesota.

== Research ==
Gupta's research centers on digital innovation, business analytics, and strategic IT management. His particular focus lies in the areas of electronic commerce, online auction, and bidding strategies. He has authored over 80 articles.

=== Electronic commerce ===
Gupta has done research in the area of Electronic commerce particularly focusing on consumer behavior, risk prediction, pricing strategies, and sales management. During his early research, he proposed a stochastic equilibrium concept for a general mathematical model and demonstrated how it supports optimal congestion internet prices and also provided a framework to manage resources in intranets using the concepts of electronic commerce. In 2004, he designed a model named GIST to provide assistance in managing and designing the interactivity and content of customer-centric websites and developed an economic model that captured consumer shopping channel choices based on the characteristics of the shopping channel and consumer risk profiles. He highlighted the use of transparency strategy as an efficient way of enhancing internet-based selling and how this could help in increasing a firm's value on the internet. In related research, he explored the impact of information technology on transparency, market information, and its structure and developed a theoretical framework to understand the process through which emerging dominance of transparent electronic markets can be inhibited. He investigated the concept of smart markets as well, which utilizes computational tools to comprehend intricate trading environments and deliver real-time decision support to human decision-makers. He also analyzed investment incentives for network infrastructure owners and explored two different pricing strategies: congestion-based negative externality pricing and the prevalent flat-rate pricing. In his work titled, "Consumption and Performance: Understanding Longitudinal Dynamics of Recommender Systems via an Agent-Based Simulation Framework," he developed an agent-based modeling and computational simulation approach to investigate several factors that affect the temporal dynamics of recommender systems' performance.

=== Auction and bidding strategies ===
Another major area of Gupta's research interest is online auctions and bidding strategies. He focused on analyzing and designing auctions, understanding bidders' behavior, and investigating how these auctions serve as an emerging mercantile process. He conducted research on multi-item online auctions, providing a comparative analysis between the Vickery version and the English version. His findings indicated that while the English version may dominate, the Vickery version exhibited higher allocative efficiency. He then presented a simulation approach using the characteristics of the Yankee auction in order to optimize sellers' revenue. Together with Ravi Bapna and Paulo Goes, he also suggested a cost-effective and risk-free simulation approach to investigate the decision behavior of bid makers and takers in web-based dynamic price-setting processes. Additionally, he presented a novel feedback scheme, specifically designed for multiattribute auctions, which helped in providing protection of buyer's preference information from the supplier and the cost schedule of supplier from the buyer. In 2009, he introduced the concept of auction overlap and examined how market-level factors such as price information, degree of overlap, auction format, and market supply influence the auction prices.

=== Continuous combinatorial auction ===
Gupta's research group has also worked on the Continuous Combinatorial Auction (CoCoA) project. The project utilized design science principles to design, build, validate, and evaluate a combinatorial bidding environment that aimed to lower computational and cognitive hurdles in order to realize the potential of the mechanism. Additionally, a key objective of the project was to promote acceptance and utilization of this complex mechanism by providing information and tools tailored to meet users' task requirements. The designed artifacts were subsequently evaluated using economic and behavioral measures.

=== Next-generation high-speed auction markets ===
Gupta is known for his work in the field of information systems, including the collaborative effort titled "Designing next-generation high-speed auction markets". The focus of this research project was to create IT tools that enhance quick decision-making in time-sensitive and information-rich B2B auction markets. He and his team established a partnership with the Dutch Flower Auctions (DFA). They developed a stable taxonomy of bidding strategies that allow market operators to adapt and optimize the key auction parameters in real- time and designed a flexible decision support framework that focuses on two models, namely prediction and optimization models. The results of the framework showed that it can help auctioneers make better tradeoffs between revenue and throughput (i.e., market clearing speed) under different market conditions and that it can increase the revenue and price stability. In addition, they developed a Hybrid Auction Mechanism that mitigates market congestion which can speed up the market clearing process without affecting expected revenue, and thus effectively mitigate the congestion problem.

=== Artificial intelligence in floriculture chain (iFlow) ===
During his time at Erasmus University, Gupta collaborated with the Rotterdam School of Management (RSM) group on a project called "Artificial Intelligence in the Floriculture Chain" (iFlow). The project was designed to develop advanced analytical methods and tools that would advise floriculture auctioneers on achieving a balance between higher commercial revenues, lower logistical distribution costs, faster deliveries, and reduced carbon emissions in transportation. The group executed eight notable projects, including bidder heterogeneity and the development of a bidder typology based on actual bidding data, multi-transaction auctioning, auctioning sequence, and role of winner bidder identification.

== Awards and honors ==
- 2001 – Career Award, NSF
- 2006 – Best Paper Award, Journal of AIS
- 2006 – Publication of the year, Senior IS Scholars (AIS)
- 2009 – Best Paper Award, INFORMS
- 2009 – Best Poster Award, Phoenix
- 2011, 2012, 2021 – Design Science Award, INFORMS
- 2014 – Distinguished Academic Fellow, INFORMS
- 2016 – Fellow, AIS
- 2020 – Impact Award, AIS
- 2021 – Best Paper Award, Information System Research
- 2021 – President's Service Award, INFORMS
- 2021 – Practical Impact Award, INFORMS
- 2021 – LEO Award, AIS

== Selected articles ==
- Gupta, A., Su, B. C., & Walter, Z. (2004). An empirical study of consumer switching from traditional to electronic channels: A purchase-decision process perspective. International Journal of Electronic Commerce, 8(3), 131–161.
- Bichler, M., Gupta, A., & Ketter, W. (2010). Research commentary – designing smart markets. Information Systems Research, 21(4), 688–699.
- Adomavicius, G., Gupta, A., & Sanyal, P. (2012). Effect of information feedback on the outcomes and dynamics of multisourcing multiattribute procurement auctions. Journal of Management Information Systems, 28(4), 199–230.
- Bhattacharya, S., Gupta, A., & Hasija, S. (2014). Joint product improvement by client and customer support center: The role of gain-share contracts in coordination. Information Systems Research, 25(1), 137–151.
- Bapna, R., Gupta, A., Ray, G., & Singh, S. (2016). Research note – IT outsourcing and the impact of advisors on clients and vendors. Information Systems Research, 27(3), 636–647.
