= Blake Ives =

- Education: University at Albany, SUNY (BS, MS); University of Minnesota (PhD)
- Known for: User information satisfaction, strategic information systems, virtual teams
- Scientific career
- Fields: Information systems
- Workplaces: College of Charleston; University of Houston

Blake Ives is an American academic and researcher known for his work in the field of information systems. He is Distinguished Scholar in Residence at the College of Charleston and professor emeritus at the University of Houston. He is a former editor-in-chief of MIS Quarterly and also served as the seventh president of the Association for Information Systems (AIS).

== Education and career ==
Ives earned a bachelor's degree from the University at Albany, SUNY in 1969 and a master's degree in computer science there in 1970. He received his PhD in management information systems from the University of Minnesota in 1978.

After holding a faculty position at Binghamton University, Ives joined the computer and information systems faculty at Dartmouth College in 1981. From 1986 to 1987, he was a Marvin Bower Fellow at Harvard Business School. He later held a John Olin Fellowship at Templeton College, University of Oxford, where he was a Distinguished Fellow at the Oxford Institute for Information Management.

Ives joined Southern Methodist University in 1988, where he held the Constantine Distinguished Chair in Management Information Systems and later served as department chair. In 1997, he joined Louisiana State University as the Ourso Family Distinguished Professor of Information Systems and director of the Center for Virtual Organization and Commerce.

In 2001, Ives joined the C.T. Bauer College of Business at the University of Houston, where he held the C.T. Bauer Chair in Business Leadership. He retired in 2021 and became professor emeritus. In the same year, he joined the College of Charleston as Distinguished Scholar in Residence.

Ives also served as editor-in-chief of MIS Quarterly from 1992 to 1994. In 1993, Ives and four past editors of MIS Quarterly published an editorial calling for the formation of a professional society for information systems. AIS later described it as one of the precursors to the organization's establishment in 1994. He served as the seventh president of the AIS from 2001 to 2002. Ives also founded the journal MISQ Discovery. He founded ISWorld in 1994, an online community for information systems scholars. He also chaired the executive committee of the International Conference on Information Systems in 1993 and served as director of research for the Society for Information Management's Advanced Practice Council. He later served as a senior editor of MIS Quarterly Executive.

== Research ==
Ives's research has focused on the use and management of information systems, including user information satisfaction, strategic information systems, customer service and virtual teams.

In 1983, he co-developed a standard short form for measuring user information satisfaction. He also examined the link between user involvement and indicators of information-system success. In 1984, Ives co-developed the Customer Resource Life Cycle model, which used stages of a customer's resource life cycle to identify strategic applications of information systems. In 1990, he co-developed a framework for evaluating the sustainability of strategic applications of information technology based on competitors' anticipated responses. In the same year, Ives and Sirkka L. Jarvenpaa published a study in Information Systems Research examining how chief executives viewed information technology. Based on 649 annual reports published between 1972 and 1987, the study found that perceptions of the role of information technology varied across industries and changed over time.

In the early 2000s, his research addressed virtual learning environments and virtual teams. In 2001, he co-developed a framework of virtual learning environment effectiveness. In a 2003 study, Ives and Gabriele Piccoli found that behavior control mechanisms typically used in traditional teams had a significant negative effect on trust in virtual teams.

His more recent work has focused on emerging digital technologies in organizational settings, including low-code and no-code development, digital twins, and generative AI.

== Honors ==
- Elected a Fellow of the Association for Information Systems (1999).
- AIS Technology Legacy (ATLAS) Award (2008).
- AIS LEO Award (2010).
