= Association for Information Systems =

Professional association

- Formation: 1994; 32 years ago
- Type: Professional body
- Headquarters: Atlanta, Georgia
- Members: over 100 countries
- President: Jan vom Brocke
- Website: aisnet.org

The Association for Information Systems (AIS) is an international, not-for-profit, professional association for scholars of information systems that was established in 1994. The association publishes journals, organizes conferences, and provides a forum for information systems professors and managers. It has members in more than 100 countries.

The association is led by a president who is annually elected from one of three world regions—the Americas, Europe and Africa and Asia-Pacific—on a rotating basis. The governing council is made up of elected functional vice-presidents and other officers and council members who are elected in the three world regions.

The association organizes four annual conferences for IS researchers, educators and students: The International Conference on Information Systems (ICIS), which alternates between the three world regions, and three regional conferences: the Americas Conference on Information Systems (AMCIS), the European Conference on Information Systems (ECIS), and the Pacific Asia Conference on Information Systems (PACIS).

== European Conference on Information Systems ==
Association for Information Systems
- Abbreviation: ECIS
- Discipline: Information systems

Publication details
- Publisher: Association for Information Systems
- History: 1993–present
- Frequency: annual

The European Conference on Information Systems (ECIS) is an annual conference for information systems and information technology academics and professionals and was affiliated with the AIS. The organization of the conference comes under the purview of the ECIS Standing Committee. After being an affiliated AIS conference for many years, ECIS now has officially been adopted as the World Region 2 (Europe, Africa and Middle East) conference for AIS since 2017.

ECIS is considered to be one of the premier information systems event in the European region, and provides a platform for panel discussions and the presentation of peer-reviewed information systems research papers. The conference more recently had acceptance rates in the low 30% range. The electronic version of the conference proceedings (1993-2008-excluding 1995 and 1998) and full citations (1993–2008) are available publicly.

The first ECIS conference took place in 1993 in Henley-on-Thames, United Kingdom.

== Publications ==
The association publishes academic journals including:

- Journal of the Association for Information Systems (JAIS)
- Scandinavian Journal of Information Systems (SJIS)
- Revista Latinoamericana Y Del Caribe De La Associacion De Sistemas De Informacion (RELCASI)
- Pacific Asia Journal of the Association for Information Systems (PAJAIS)
- Journal of the Midwest Association for Information Systems (JMWAIS)
- Journal of Information Technology Theory and Application (JITTA)
- Communications of the Association for Information Systems (CAIS)
- AIS Transactions on Replication Research (TRR)
- AIS Transactions on Human-Computer Interaction (THCI)

Affiliated journals include:

- Business & Information Systems Engineering (BISE)
- Management Information Systems Quarterly (MISQ)
- MIS Quarterly Executive (MISQe)
- Information Systems Journal (ISJ)
- Systèmes d'Information et Management (SIM)
- Foundations and Trends in Information Systems (FnTIS)

Both AIS published titles and affiliated journals are included in the AIS eLibrary, which is accessible as a benefit of membership.

== LEO Award ==
Since 1999 the AIS annually grants the Leo Award to one or more persons, who have made exceptional contributions to the research and practice of Information Systems. Award recipients have been:

- 1999 : C. West Churchman, J. Daniel Couger, Börje Langefors, Enid Mumford
- 2000 : Gordon B. Davis
- 2001 : Richard O. Mason
- 2002 : Jay Nunamaker, Paul Gray
- 2003 : Frank Land, John F. Rockart
- 2004 : William Richard King, Rob Kling
- 2005 : Andrew B. Whinston
- 2006 : Niels Bjørn-Andersen, Phillip Ein-Dor
- 2007 : Izak Benbasat, Ephraim McLean
- 2008 : Dewald Roode, M. Lynne Markus, Robert W. Zmud, Kenneth L. Kraemer
- 2009 : Daniel Robey, E. Burton Swanson
- 2010 : Blake Ives, Carol Saunders
- 2011 : Richard (Rick) Watson, Ron Weber
- 2012 : Bob Galliers, Detmar Straub
- 2013 : Rudy Hirschheim, Kalle Lyytinen
- 2014 : Joey George, Ting-Ping (T.P.) Liang
- 2015 : Dennis Galletta, Allen Lee, Kwok Kee Wei, Dov Te'eni
- 2016 : Richard Baskerville, James Marsden
- 2017 : Sirkka Jarvenpaa, Vallabh Sambamurthy
- 2018 : David Avison, Jane Fedorowicz
- 2019 : Ritu Agarwal, Michael D. Myers, Arun Rai
- 2020 : Cynthia Beath, Varun Grover, Elena Karahanna, Jae Kyu Lee
- 2021 : Alan Dennis, Alok Gupta, Dorothy E. Leidner
- 2022 : Suzanne Rivard, Rajiv Sabherwal, Geoff Walsham, Joe Valachich
- 2023 : Soon Ang, Chrisanthi Avgerou, Yolande Chan, F. Warren McFarlan
- 2024 : Brian Fitzgerald, Shirley Gregor, Sudha Ram, Bernard Tan

== Other Awards ==
The AIS awards several other awards including for best papers of the field and for educational achievement.

== See also ==
- Management information system
