= Ping Zhang (information scientist) =

American computer scientist

- 张苹
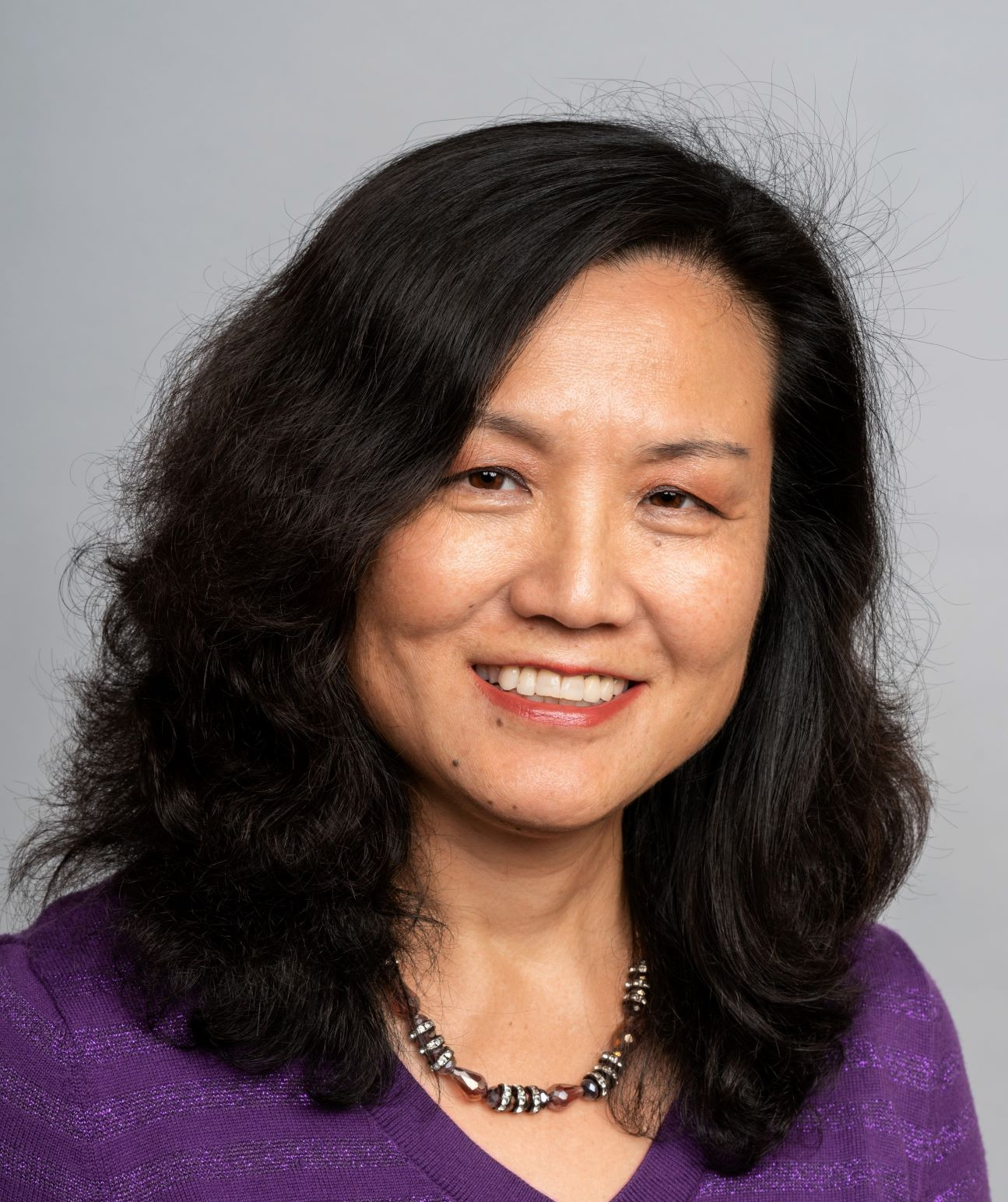
- Zhang in 2019
- Born: Hohhot, China
- Scientific career
- Fields: Information systems; Human–computer interaction
- Workplaces: Syracuse University School of Information Studies
- Doctoral advisor: Andrew B. Whinston

Ping Zhang is an American scholar in information systems and human–computer interaction. She is notable for her work on establishing the human–computer interaction community inside the information systems field, bridging various camps of human–computer interaction research and exploring intellectual characteristics of the information field. She co-authored with Dov Te’eni and Jane Carey the first HCI textbook for non-computer science students.

Zhang is the co-founding EIC of AIS Transactions on Human–Computer Interaction. She was a senior editor of Journal of the Association for Information Systems, where she is also the author of the inaugural article.

During 2013–2015, Zhang was the first historian for the Association for Information Systems.

In 2015, Ping Zhang was named as a fellow of the American Council on Education (ACE) for the 2015–2016 academic year.

Ping Zhang received her PhD in information systems from the McCombs School of Business at the University of Texas at Austin, and M.Sc. and B.Sc. in computer science from Peking University, Beijing, China.

== Selected works ==
- Zhang, Ping (2013). "The Affective Response Model: A Theoretical Framework of Affective Concepts and Their Relationships in the ICT Context". Management Information Systems Quarterly. 37 (1): 247–274. doi:10.25300/MISQ/2013/37.1.11.
- Wang, Chingning; Zhang, Ping (2012). "The Evolution of Social Commerce: An Examination from the People, Business, Technology, and Information Perspective". Communications of the AIS. 31 5: 105–127.
- Zhang, Ping; Sun, Heshan (2009). "The complexity of different types of attitude in initial and continued ICT use". Journal of American Society for Information Science and Technology. 60 (10): 2048–2063. doi:10.1002/asi.21116.
- Zhang, Ping (2008). "Motivational affordances: Fundamental reasons for ICT design and use". Communications of the ACM. 51 (11). doi:10.1145/1400214.1400244.
- Zhang, Ping; Li, Na (September 2005). "The Importance of Affective Quality". Communications of the ACM. 48 (9): 105–108. doi:10.1145/1081992.1081997.
- Zhang, Ping; Galletta, Dennis, eds. (2006). Human–Computer Interaction and Management Information Systems – Foundations. Series of Advances in Management Information Systems. Armonk, NY: M.E. Sharpe. ISBN 0-7656-1486-3.
- Galletta, Dennis; Zhang, Ping, eds. (2006). Human–Computer Interaction and Management Information Systems – Applications. Series of Advances in Management Information Systems. Armonk, NY: M.E. Sharpe. ISBN 0-7656-1487-1.
