= Walsham =

Walsham (/ˈwɔːlʃəm/ WAWL-shəm) may refer to:

People:

- John Walsham (theologian), 14th-century Franciscan scholar
- Geoff Walsham (born 1946), English scholar in the Social Study of Information Systems
- Mark Walsham (born 1962), English cyclist
- William Johnson Walsham (1847–1903), English surgeon
- Walsham baronets, of Knill Court in the County of Hereford, a title in the Baronetage of the United Kingdom
  - Sir John Walsham, 2nd Baronet (1830–1905), British diplomat
- Walsham How (1823–1897), English bishop

Places:

- North Walsham, market town and civil parish in Norfolk, England
- South Walsham, village and civil parish in Norfolk, England
- Walsham Rocks, group of rocks east of Buff Island at the southwest end of the Palmer Archipelago, Antarctica
- Walsham le Willows, village in Suffolk, England

== See also ==
- Walsheim
- Walsingham
- Willisham
- Wolsingham
