= Kalle Lyytinen =

Professor

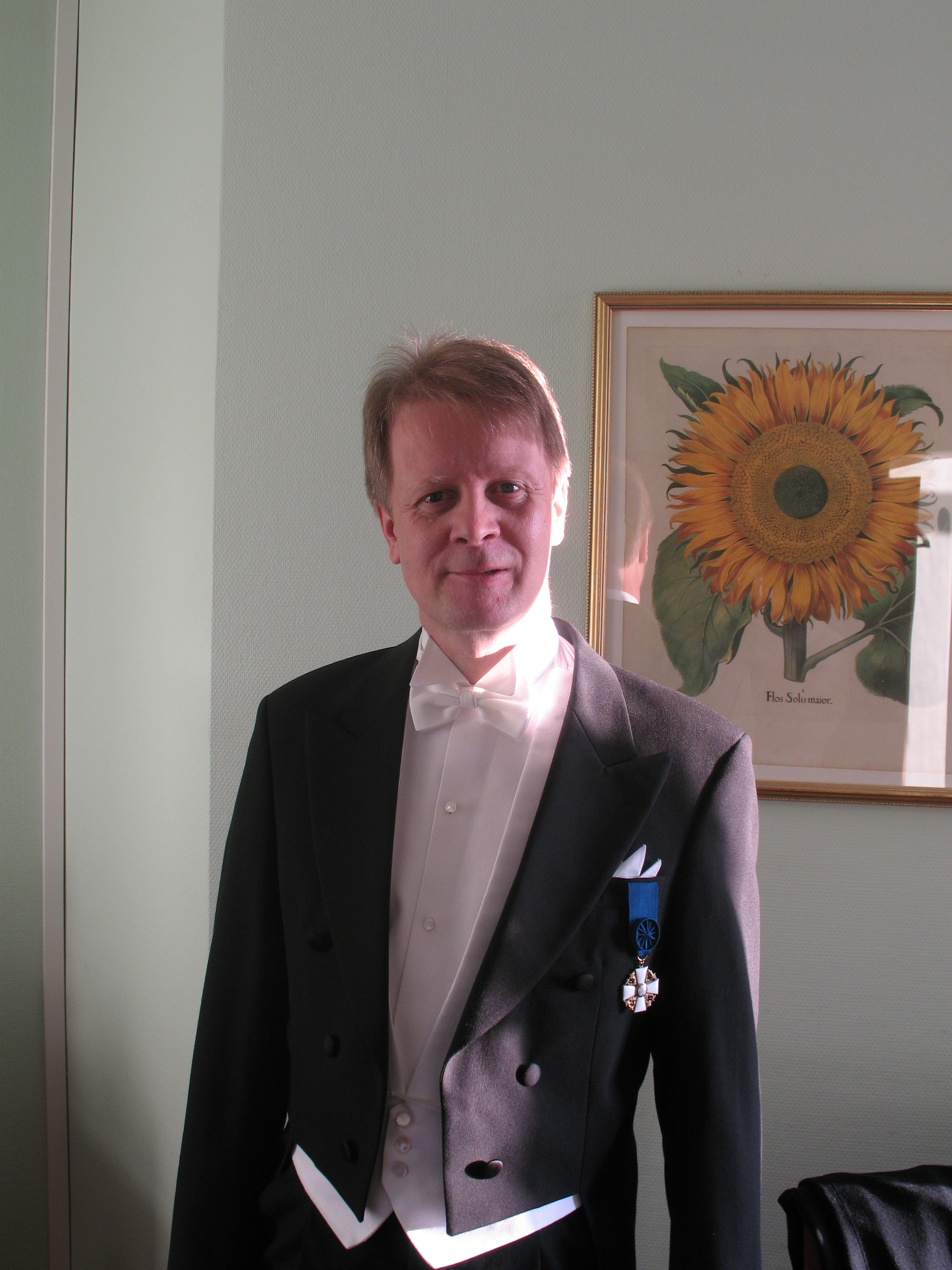
- Born: 19 August 1953 (age 73); Helsinki, Finland
- Education: University of Jyvaskyla
- Scientific career
- Fields: Information System
- Workplaces: Case Western Reserve University; Aalto University

Kalle Lyytinen (born August 19, 1953 in Helsinki) is the Iris S. Wolstein Professor of Management Design at Case Western Reserve University's Weatherhead School of Management, and a director of its Doctor of Management programs Doctor of Management program. He is a scholar in information systems (IS) and digital innovation, he is known for his foundational contributions to systems design, organizational IT failures, and digital transformation. Lyytinen received the LEO Award (2013), the Association for Information Systems highest honor, and AIS Practical Impact award for entrepreneurship and innovation in 2024 and has been cited over 60000 times.

== Biography ==
Lyytinen received his PhD, Econ Lic, and MS from the University of Jyvaskyla (Finland), and has received honorary doctorates from Umeå University (Sweden), Copenhagen Business School (Denmark), and Lappeenranta University of Technology (Finland). Fluent in both Finnish and English, Lyytinen holds dual Finnish-American citizenship and currently resides in Shaker Heights, Ohio.

== Career ==
Lyytinen’s academic career spans over four decades. Since 2001, he has held the Iris S. Wolstein Professor of Management Design position at Case Western Reserve University’s Weatherhead School of Management, concurrently serving as Director of Academic Affairs for doctor of management programs since 2009.

From 2020 to 2024, he was a Distinguished Visiting Professor at Aalto University’s Department of Industrial Management and Operations, followed by a 2024 Research Excellence Fellowship at Karlsruhe Institute of Technology.

Lyytinen has held several visiting professorships at institutions including the University of Sydney in 2019, Sorbonne University in 2017, and the University of Cape Town in 2016. He was also a faculty member at the London School of Economics from 2012 to 2016 and served as a Visiting CIIR Professor at Umeå University between 2011 and 2017.

Additionally, Lyytinen held visiting positions at Georgia State University, Hong Kong City University, and the Hong Kong University of Science and Technology in the 1990s. At the University of Jyväskylä in Finland, he served as Dean of the Faculty of Social Sciences from 1994 to 1996 and as Dean of the School of Information Technology from 1998 to 2000.

Lyytinen is notable for his breadth of scholarship and leadership in the field of Information Systems. In 2013 he received the Association for Information Systems Leo Award, which is the association's top honor.

Lyytinen has written over 300 scholarly publications. Notable books include: Information Systems : The State of the Field, with John Leslie King, published by John Wiley & Sons in 2006, and, Information Systems Development and Data Modeling - Conceptual and Philosophical Foundations, with Rudy Hirschheim and Heinz Klein, published by Cambridge University Press in 1995/2008.

== Research ==
Lyytinen’s research explores digital innovation, systems design methodologies, and IT-enabled organizational transformation. He pioneered frameworks for analyzing information system failures and integrating social action theories into IS development. His work on digital infrastructures and design processes has influenced studies on industry coordination and technological evolution. Lyytinen co-edited the Handbook of Digital Innovation (2020), a seminal text on digitalization’s impact across industries.

== Selected publications ==
=== Books ===
- Cola, Philip A.; Lyytinen, Kalle; Nartker, S. A., eds. (2020). Voices of practitioner scholars in management: the history and impact of the Doctor of Management Programs at Case Western Reserve University. Wilmington, Ohio: Published for Weatherhead School of Management, Case Western Reserve University by Orange Frazer Press. ISBN 978-1-949248-21-0. OCLC 1246293567.
- Lyytinen, Kalle; Nambisan, Satish; Joseph, Keithley; Keithley, Nancy, eds. (2020). Handbook of Digital Innovation. Edward Elgar. ISBN 978-1-78811-997-9.
- Fisher, Michael T.; Abbott, Martin; Lyytinen, Kalle (2014). The power of customer misbehavior: drive growth and innovation by learning from your customers. Basingstoke, Hampshire: Palgrave Macmillan. doi:10.1057/9781137348920. ISBN 978-1-137-34892-0.
- Kalle, Lyytinen (1986). Information systems development as social action : framework and critical implications. ISBN 978-952-86-0530-0.
- Hirschheim, Rudy; Klein, Heinz K.; Lyytinen, Kalle (27 October 1995). Information Systems Development and Data Modeling. Cambridge University Press. doi:10.1017/cbo9780511895425. ISBN 978-0-521-37369-2.
- Brinkkemper, Sjaak (1996). Method Engineering: Principles of Method Construction and Tool Support. IFIP Advances in Information and Communication Technology Ser. Kalle Lyytinen, Richard Welke. New York, NY: Springer. ISBN 978-0-387-35080-6.
- Falkenberg, Eckhard D.; Lyyntinen, Kalle; Verrijn, -Stuart Alex, eds. (2000). Information systems concepts: an integrated discipline emerging; IFIP TC 8 /WG 8.1 International Conference on Information System Concepts: an Integrated Discipline Emerging (ISCO-4): September 20 - 22, 1999. International Federation for Information Processing, IFIP. Boston, Mass.: Kluwer Acad. Publ. ISBN 978-0-7923-7806-8.

=== Journals ===
- Lyytinen, Kalle J. (1985). "Implications of Theories of Language for Information Systems". MIS Quarterly. 9 (1): 61–74. doi:10.2307/249274. ISSN 0276-7783. JSTOR 249274.
- Lehtinen, Erkki; Lyytinen, Kalle (1986). "Action based model of information system". Information Systems. 11 (4): 299–317. doi:10.1016/0306-4379(86)90010-4. ISSN 0306-4379.
- Lyytinen, Kalle; Hirschheim, Rudy (1988). "Information systems as rational discourse: an application of Habermas's theory of communicative action". Scandinavian Journal of Management. 4 (1–2): 19–30. doi:10.1016/0956-5221(88)90013-9. ISSN 0956-5221.
- Lyytinen, Kalle; Mathiassen, Lars; Ropponen, Janne (1998). "Attention Shaping and Software Risk—A Categorical Analysis of Four Classical Risk Management Approaches". Information Systems Research. 9 (3): 233–255. doi:10.1287/isre.9.3.233. ISSN 1047-7047.
- Lyytinen, Kalle; Robey, Daniel (1999). "Learning failure in information systems development". Information Systems Journal. 9 (2): 85–101. doi:10.1046/j.1365-2575.1999.00051.x. ISSN 1350-1917.
- Schmidt, Roy; Lyytinen, Kalle; Keil, Mark; Cule, Paul (2001). "Identifying Software Project Risks: An International Delphi Study". Journal of Management Information Systems. 17 (4): 5–36. doi:10.1080/07421222.2001.11045662. ISSN 0742-1222.
- Lyytinen, Kalle; Yoo, Youngjin (2002). "Research Commentary: The Next Wave of Nomadic Computing". Information Systems Research. 13 (4): 377–388. doi:10.1287/isre.13.4.377.75. ISSN 1047-7047.
- Lyytinen; Rose (2003). "The Disruptive Nature of Information Technology Innovations: The Case of Internet Computing in Systems Development Organizations". MIS Quarterly. 27 (4): 557. doi:10.2307/30036549. ISSN 0276-7783. JSTOR 30036549.
- Yoo, Youngjin; Boland, Richard J.; Lyytinen, Kalle (2006). "From Organization Design to Organization Designing". Organization Science. 17 (2): 215–229. doi:10.1287/orsc.1050.0168. ISSN 1047-7039.
- Boland, Richard J.; Lyytinen, Kalle; Yoo, Youngjin (2007). "Wakes of Innovation in Project Networks: The Case of Digital 3-D Representations in Architecture, Engineering, and Construction". Organization Science. 18 (4): 631–647. doi:10.1287/orsc.1070.0304. ISSN 1047-7039.
- Yoo, Youngjin; Henfridsson, Ola; Lyytinen, Kalle (2010). "Research Commentary—The New Organizing Logic of Digital Innovation: An Agenda for Information Systems Research". Information Systems Research. 21 (4): 724–735. doi:10.1287/isre.1100.0322. ISSN 1047-7047.
- Tilson, David; Lyytinen, Kalle; Sørensen, Carsten (2010). "Research Commentary—Digital Infrastructures: The Missing IS Research Agenda". Information Systems Research. 21 (4): 748–759. doi:10.1287/isre.1100.0318. ISSN 1047-7047.
- Jarke, Matthias; Loucopoulos, Pericles; Lyytinen, Kalle; Mylopoulos, John; Robinson, William (2011). "The brave new world of design requirements". Information Systems. 36 (7): 992–1008. doi:10.1016/j.is.2011.04.003. ISSN 0306-4379.
- Yoo, Youngjin; Boland, Richard J.; Lyytinen, Kalle; Majchrzak, Ann (2012). "Organizing for Innovation in the Digitized World" (PDF). Organization Science. 23 (5): 1398–1408. doi:10.1287/orsc.1120.0771. ISSN 1047-7039.
- Carlo; Lyytinen; Boland (2012). "Dialectics of Collective Minding: Contradictory Appropriations of Information Technology in a High-Risk Project". MIS Quarterly. 36 (4): 1081. doi:10.2307/41703499. ISSN 0276-7783. JSTOR 41703499.
- Grover, Varun; Lyytinen, Kalle (2 February 2015). "New State of Play in Information Systems Research: The Push to the Edges". MIS Quarterly. 39 (2): 271–296. doi:10.25300/misq/2015/39.2.01. ISSN 0276-7783.
- Nambisan, Satish; Lyytinen, Kalle; Majchrzak, Ann; Song, Michael (1 January 2017). "Digital Innovation Management: Reinventing Innovation Management Research in a Digital World". MIS Quarterly. 41 (1): 223–238. doi:10.25300/misq/2017/41:1.03. ISSN 0276-7783.
- Karhu, Kimmo; Gustafsson, Robin; Lyytinen, Kalle (2018). "Exploiting and Defending Open Digital Platforms with Boundary Resources: Android's Five Platform Forks" (PDF). Information Systems Research. 29 (2): 479–497. doi:10.1287/isre.2018.0786. ISSN 1047-7047.

=== Special issues ===
- Lyytinen, Kalle; Welke, Richard (1999). "Guest editorial: Special issue on meta-modelling and methodology engineering". Information Systems. 24 (2): 67–69. doi:10.1016/s0306-4379(99)00005-8. ISSN 0306-4379.
- Lyytinen, Kalle; King, John L. (2002). "Around the cradle of the wireless revolution: the emergence and evolution of cellular telephony". Telecommunications Policy. 26 (3–4): 97–100. doi:10.1016/s0308-5961(02)00002-2. ISSN 0308-5961.
- Lyytinen; King (2006). "Standard Making: A Critical Research Frontier for Information Systems Research". MIS Quarterly. 30: 405–411. doi:10.2307/25148766. ISSN 0276-7783. JSTOR 25148766.
- Galliers, Robert D.; Jarvenpaa, Sirkka L.; Chan, Yolande E.; Lyytinen, Kalle (2012). "Strategic information systems: Reflections and prospectives". The Journal of Strategic Information Systems. 21 (2): 85–90. doi:10.1016/j.jsis.2012.07.001. ISSN 0963-8687.
- Yoo, Youngjin; Boland, Richard J.; Lyytinen, Kalle; Majchrzak, Ann (2012). "Organizing for Innovation in the Digitized World" (PDF). Organization Science. 23 (5): 1398–1408. doi:10.1287/orsc.1120.0771. ISSN 1047-7039.
- Forman, Chris; King, John Leslie; Lyytinen, Kalle (2014). "Special Section Introduction—Information, Technology, and the Changing Nature of Work". Information Systems Research. 25 (4): 789–795. doi:10.1287/isre.2014.0551. ISSN 1047-7047.
- Nambisan, Satish; Lyytinen, Kalle; Majchrzak, Ann; Song, Michael (1 January 2017). "Digital Innovation Management: Reinventing Innovation Management Research in a Digital World". MIS Quarterly. 41 (1): 223–238. doi:10.25300/misq/2017/41:1.03. ISSN 0276-7783.
- Grover, Varun; Lyytinen, Kalle (17 March 2022). "Special Issue Editorial: Platform Competition in the Digital Era - Overview and Research Directions". MIS Quarterly Executive. 21 (1). ISSN 1540-1960.
- Butler, Tom; Gozman, Daniel; Lyytinen, Kalle (2023). "The regulation of and through information technology: Towards a conceptual ontology for IS research". Journal of Information Technology. 38 (2): 86–107. doi:10.1177/02683962231181147. ISSN 0268-3962.
