= ICIS =

ICIS may refer to:

- Independent Commodity Intelligence Services
- International Conference on Information Systems
