= Flensburg (disambiguation) =

Flensburg is a town in northern Germany.

Flensburg may also refer to:

== People ==
- Per Flensburg (born 1946), Swedish author, researcher, and professor

== Populated places ==
- Flensburg, Malmö, a neighborhood of the city of Malmö, Sweden
- Flensburg, Minnesota, a city in the United States

== Other uses ==
- Flensburg Fjord, an inlet of the Baltic Sea between Germany and Denmark
- Flensburg Government, the short-lived May 1945 Nazi government led by Karl Dönitz
- Flensburg radar detector, a device carried by some German fighter aircraft during World War 2
- Flensburg station, serving Flensburg, Germany
- University of Flensburg, in Germany

== See also ==
- Flansburgh (disambiguation)
