= Lansburgh =

Lansburgh may refer to:

- G. Albert Lansburgh (1876–1969), American architect, known for his work on luxury cinemas and theatres
- Richard H. Lansburgh (1893–1942), American economist, management consultant, Professor of Industry at the University of Pennsylvania's Wharton School
- Lansburgh Theatre in downtown Washington, D.C.
- Lansburgh's, a chain of department stores in the Washington, D.C. area

== See also ==
- Flansburgh (surname)
