= William Richard King =

American scientist (1938–2026)

William Richard King (December 24, 1938 – July 23, 2026) was an American university professor who studied and researched management science and information systems at the University of Pittsburgh in Pennsylvania. He was the Founding President of the Association for Information Systems, co-founder of the International Conference on Information Systems, the founder of the America's Conference on Information Systems, and the thirty-sixth President of The Institute of Management Sciences (TIMS). He had an h-index of 77 when including all of the fields in which he published, according to Google Scholar.

== Biography ==
William R. King was born in Southwestern Pennsylvania to Dewey Clark and Cambria Edith (Jones) King. He grew up in a small town called Elrama in Southwestern Pennsylvania. He described himself as a "township kid" at the time he went to Clairton High School. In high school, he was chosen to speak for his class of 450 at the graduation ceremony. In a memoir which was written in September 2011, he recalled a story that happened in tenth grade and he thought his life changed at Clairton High School.

King received his bachelor's degree (with honors) at Pennsylvania State University in 1960. In college, he was in the Air Force ROTC and was named "Outstanding Cadet" in his junior year and "Distinguished Military Graduate" on graduation. After graduation, he worked as an industrial engineer for Pittsburgh Steel Company. Then he enrolled in graduate school and received his master's degree at Case Institute of Technology in 1962, and Ph.D. in Operations Research at Case Institute of Technology in 1964. Professor Russell L. Ackoff was his advisor. King shaped his professional goals with the help of Professor Russell L. Ackoff and he transferred from a jet pilot to a scholar and consultant.

After getting his Ph.D., King was appointed Assistant Professor of Operations Research at Case and served from 1964 to 1965, a very unusual thing for a graduate to be so appointed. From 1965 to 1967, he served as a First Lieutenant in the US Air Force. He was an Assistant Professor of Statistics and Operations Research at the Air Force Institute of Technology.

In 1967, King became an associate professor at the University of Pittsburgh's graduate school of business. In 1968, he was promoted to full professor, the youngest person to be so named in the modern history of the university. After arriving at the University of Pittsburgh, King led the redesign of the doctoral program and the creation of a multi-school "MS in Telecommunications" degree, "Techno MBA" and MS-MBA Double Degree programs. These programs grew significantly under his leadership.

King remained at the University of Pittsburgh for 41 years. During this time, he had a number of visiting (in-residence) assignments at City University of Hong Kong, University of California-Berkeley, Singapore National University, Auckland University, National Sun Yat-Sen University (Taiwan), Travelers Insurance's Research Department, among others. He mentored over 100 Ph.D. graduates. In 2008, he retired as "university professor", which is the most distinguished academic rank from the University of Pittsburgh.

King married his high school sweetheart, Fay Eileen Bickerton, in 1958. They have one child and ten grandchildren.

King died on July 23, 2026, at the age of 87.

== Recognition ==
King received the Marquis Who's Who Lifetime Achievement Award in 2019. In 2004, he received the "AIS LEO Award". LEO Award is an honor to recognize outstanding scholars who have an impact on the field of information systems globally and also have an impact outside the field. In 2002, he was recognized as Institute for Operations Research and the Management Science Fellow (INFORMS Fellow). INFORMS Fellow receipts are expected to be outstanding lifetime achievements in operations research and management sciences and have significant accomplishments in advancing of operations research and management science. In 1999, he was awarded "AIS Fellow Award". AIS Fellow Award is an honor to recognize scholars who have a high degree of professional and personal integrity, and have significant contributions to the field globally. He was awarded Fellow of the Decision Science Institute and a full member of the Association for the Advancement of Science.

King had a impact on the fields of operations research, management science, and information systems. He established AIS (Association for Information Systems) and served as the first president of AIS from 1994 to 1995. His presidency of TIMS (The Institute of Management Sciences) led to the establishment of INFORMS in 1995. He was co-founder of the annual International Conference on Information System. He founded the annual America's Conference on Information Systems.

== Research and Professional Activities ==
King authored 325 papers (according to Google Scholar) and 19 books.

King's research interest included strategic planning, project management, information systems in management, system analysis, knowledge management, knowledge management systems, organizational learning, business planning, and strategic use of information systems. His findings in research have been applied to business and finance. King's method has been applied to develop FICO scores. He also developed a concept that laid out the foundation of strategic information systems. The McKinsey Foundation recognized "Systems Analysis and Project Management", a book he co-authored with David Cleland, as a seminal work to management. "Project Management Handbook", which he co-edited, was recognized as the AIIE's Book-of-Year Award.

Throughout his career, King was active in academic publishing. He served as editor-in-chief of Management Information Systems Quarterly (MISQ), as an associate editor of six other journals, and conceived, founded, and secured a publisher for Information Systems Research (ISR).

King served as a senior staff member to the US Senate Budget Committee in 1976–1977. Sam Nunn, a United States Senator from Georgia (1976–1997) as a member of the Democratic Party, was the appointer. King was a licensed private pilot and motorcyclist and a certified sailboat captain and SCUBA diver. He joked that he was also a CPA - Certified Pesticide Applicator - a certification that he found useful to obtain when he bought a farm with an orchard.

== Selected publications ==
- King, William R.; Rodriguez, Jaime I. (1978). "Evaluating Management Information Systems". MIS Quarterly. 2 (3): 43–51. doi:10.2307/249177. JSTOR 249177.
- King, W.R.; Grover, V. (November 1991). "The strategic use of information resources: an exploratory study". IEEE Transactions on Engineering Management. 38 (4): 293–305. doi:10.1109/17.97436.
- Fahey, Liam; King, William R.; Narayanan, Vadake K. (February 1981). "Environmental scanning and forecasting in strategic planning—The state of the art". Long Range Planning. 14 (1): 32–39. doi:10.1016/0024-6301(81)90148-5.
- King, William R.; Grover, Varun; Hufnagel, Ellen H. (September 1989). "Using information and information technology for sustainable competitive advantage: Some empirical evidence". Information & Management. 17 (2): 87–93. doi:10.1016/0378-7206(89)90010-4.
- Premkumar, G.; King, William R. (September 1992). "An Empirical Assessment of Information Systems Planning and the Role of Information Systems in Organizations". Journal of Management Information Systems. 9 (2): 99–125. doi:10.1080/07421222.1992.11517960.
- Premkumar, G.; King, William R. (June 1994). "Organizational Characteristics and Information Systems Planning: An Empirical Study". Information Systems Research. 5 (2): 75–109. doi:10.1287/isre.5.2.75.
- King, William R.; Teo, Thompson S.H. (March 1996). "Key Dimensions of Facilitators and Inhibitors for the Strategic Use of Information Technology". Journal of Management Information Systems. 12 (4): 35–53. doi:10.1080/07421222.1996.11518100.

== Selected books ==
- Organizational Transformation through Business Process Reengineering: Applying Lessons Learned (1998) ASIN B0140F1LB2
- Marketing Management Information Systems (1977) ISBN 0884054446
- Systems Analysis and Project Management (1983) ISBN 0070113114
- Marketing Scientific and Technical Information (2020) ISBN 978-0367170790
- Knowledge Management and Organizational Learning (2009) ISBN 978-1441900074
- Strategic Planning and Policy (1978) ISBN 0442804407
- Planning for Information Systems (2009) ISBN 978-0765619501
- School Days: Coming of Age in the Mid-20th Century (2012) ISBN 1479707538
- School Days II (2013) ISBN 978-1483661469
