= Varun Grover =

Varun Grover may refer to:

- Varun Grover (information scientist) (born 1959), American academic
- Varun Grover (writer) (born 1980), Indian songwriter
