= Information Systems Research in Scandinavia =

Non-profit organization

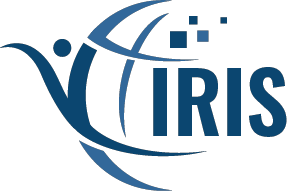
- Abbreviation: IRIS
- Formation: 1978
- Type: Nonprofit
- Region served: Nordics
- President: Najmul Islam
- Main organ: IRIS Executive Board
- Affiliations: Association for Information Systems
- Website: https://communities.aisnet.org/scandinavia/home

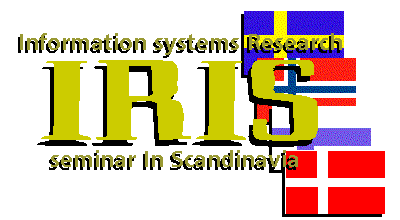
IRIS Association logo from the 1990s

The IRIS (Information Systems Research in Scandinavia) Association is a non-profit organization aiming to promote research and research education in the use, development, and management of information systems (IS) in the Nordic region, and making sure that research known in the international research community and among practitioners. The Association was formed around the annual IRIS conference which has run since 1978. The IRIS Association was formally registered in 1997. The IRIS Association also represents the Scandinavian chapter of the Association for Information Systems (AIS) serving AIS members in the Nordic region.

The IRIS Association manages the Scandinavian Journal of Information Systems (SJIS) and organizes the IRIS Conference as well as the Scandinavian Conference on Information Systems Conference (SCIS). The current president of the association is Aleksandre Asatiani (2025-2026).

== Governance ==
The IRIS Association is steered by the executive board consisting of four senior members (President, Treasurer, Secretary, and Ordinary member) and two PhD student members. The board members are elected by the members of the association present at the annual business meeting which takes place during the IRIS/SCIS conferences. Senior members are elected for a four-year term, PhD student members are elected for a two-year term. Each senior member represents one of the four IRIS countries (Finland, Sweden, Norway, Denmark). PhD members represent two alternating IRIS countries.

The executive board is responsible for ensuring the purpose of the association as defined by its bylaws, overseeing the IRIS/SCIS conference arrangements, appointing editorial board members of the Scandinavian Journal of Information Systems, and running the daily operations of the association.

== IRIS and SCIS Conferences ==
In 1978, the IRIS Association started holding annual conferences, and it is the oldest consecutive IS conference in the world. The initiative came from a group of Finnish computer science professors including Pentti Kerola (University of Oulu), Pertti Järvinen (Tampere University), and Eero Peltola (University of Jyväskylä), who organized the first conference in Tampere. The purpose of the conference was to create a space for Nordic scholars to discuss developments in the research on systems analysis and design and later information systems. The first nine editions of the conference were known as the Scandinavian Research Seminar on Systemeering. The current name, IRIS, was adopted in 1987. The conference is organized as an annual working seminar for Nordic researchers and PhD students. After the first few meetings in Finland, the locations now alternate between four Nordic countries: Finland, Sweden, Norway, and Denmark. Among the subjects discussed at the IRIS conferences are Digital Transformation, Emerging Technology, Business Process Management and Participatory Design.

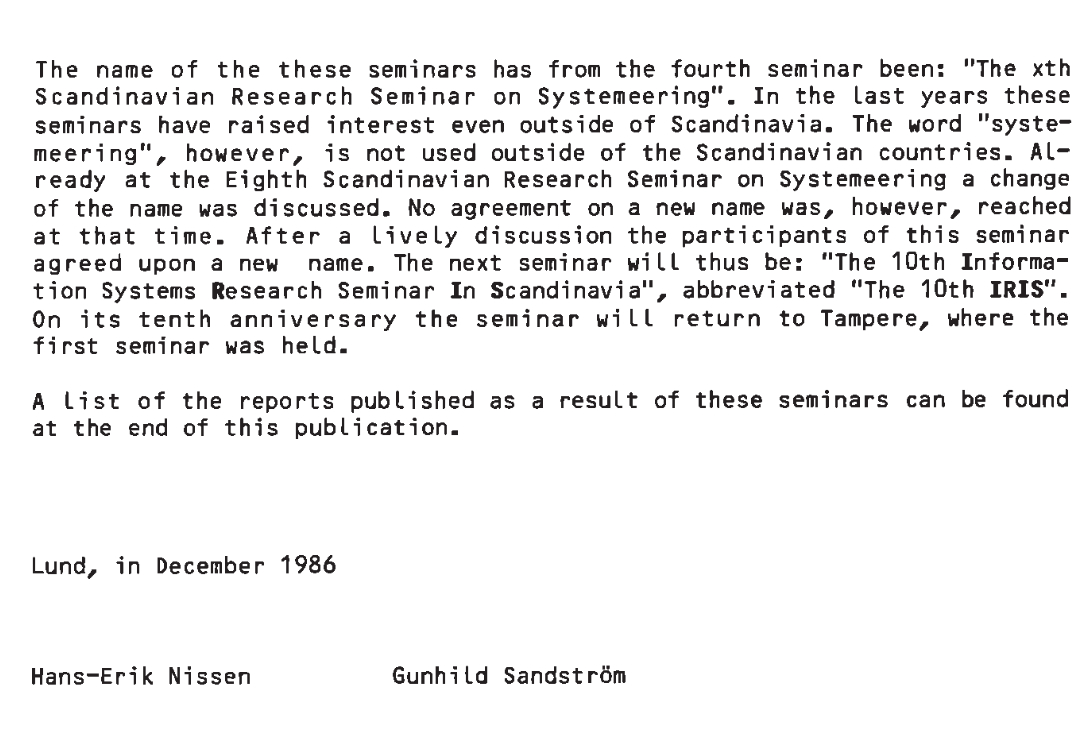
Excerpt from the preface of report of the 9th Scandinavian Research Seminar on Systemeering describing decision to adopt the name IRIS

In 2006, Judith Molka-Danielsen and her associates published a paper that identified the most prolific authors who had successfully submitted papers to IRIS. The top ten researchers were: Lars Mathiassen, Markku Nurminen, Pertti Järvinen, Carsten Sørensen, Per Flensburg, Karl Heinz Kautz, Peter Axel Nielsen, Lars Svensson, Urban Nuldén, and Ole Hanseth.

In 2010, the IRIS Association launched the Scandinavian Conference on Information Systems (SCIS), which is organized in conjunction with the IRIS conference. SCIS format resembles other major information systems conferences, focusing on a selection of more complete and rigorously reviewed research papers presented during the conference sessions. The conference proceedings are published by the electronic library of the Association for Information Systems.

In 2020-2021, two conferences IRIS43/SCIS11 (Sundsvall) and IRIS44/SCIS12 (Orkanger) were organized online due to restrictions and safety considerations brought by the COVID-19 pandemic.

In August 2026 the IRIS/SCIS were organized in Iceland, marking the first time the events were organized outside of the original four member countries.

The next IRIS/SCIS conference will be held near Aarhus, Denmark in August 2027.

== Past Conference Locations ==
Year	Conference	City	Country	Theme
2026	IRIS49/SCIS17	Borgarnes	Iceland	IS in a Volatile World: Data, Resilience, and Emergency Preparedness
2025	IRIS48/SCIS16	Oslo	Norway	Challenging Boundaries in Digitalization Research: Towards Inclusivity and Fairness
2024	IRIS47/SCIS15	Uddevalla	Sweden	Improving Society for ALL with IS
2023	IRIS46/SCIS14	Porvoo	Finland	Reflecting on the Nordic Approach to IS Research
2022	IRIS45/SCIS13	Helsinge	Denmark	Workforce Leadership in the Age of Digital Transformation
2021	IRIS44/SCIS12	Orkanger (Online)	Norway	Living in a Digital World?
2020	IRIS43/SCIS11	Sundsvall (Online)	Sweden	Digitalization in Times of Transition
2019	IRIS42/SCIS10	Nokia	Finland	Smart Transformation
2018	IRIS41/SCIS9	Aarhus	Denmark	Digital Adaption, Disruption and Survival
2017	IRIS40/SCIS8	Halden	Norway	Challenging Smart
2016	IRIS39/SCIS7	Ljungskile	Sweden	Living in the Cloud
2015	IRIS38/SCIS6	Oulu	Finland	System Design for, with and by Users
2014	IRIS37/SCIS5	Ringsted	Denmark	Designing Human Technologies
2013	IRIS36/SCIS4	Gran	Norway	Digital Living
2012	IRIS35/SCIS3	Sigtuna	Sweden	Designing the Interactive Society
2011	IRIS34/SCIS2	Turku	Finland	ICT of Culture - Culture of ICT
2010	IRIS33/SCIS1	Rebild	Denmark	Engaged Scandinavian IS Research
2009	IRIS32	Molde	Norway	Inclusive Design
2008	IRIS31	Åre	Sweden	Public Systems in the Future – Possibilities, Challenges and Pitfalls
2007	IRIS30	Tampere	Finland	Models, Methods, and New Messages
2006	IRIS29	Helsingør	Denmark	Paradigms Politics Paradoxes
2005	IRIS28	Kristiansand	Norway	Reaching Out
2004	IRIS27	Falkenberg	Sweden	Learn IT, Know IT, Move IT
2003	IRIS26	Porvoo	Finland	Scandinavian Approach to IS Research?
2002	IRIS25	Bautahøj	Denmark	New Ways of Working
2001	IRIS24	Ulvik in Hardanger	Norway	Knowledge Systems
2000	IRIS23	Uddevalla	Sweden	Doing IT Together
1999	IRIS22	Keuruu	Finland	Enterprise Architectures for Virtual Organisations
1998	IRIS21	Sæby	Denmark	No Theme
1997	IRIS20	Hankø	Norway	Social Informatics
1996	IRIS19	Lökeberg	Sweden	The Future
1995	IRIS18	Gjern	Denmark	Design in Context
1994	IRIS17	Syöte	Finland	Quality by Diversity in Information Systems Research
1993	IRIS16	Copenhagen	Denmark	No Theme
1992	IRIS15	Larkollen	Norway	No Theme
1991	IRIS14	Umeå-Lövånger	Sweden	What are Our Most Important Research Questions?
1990	IRIS13	Turku	Finland	Reconstruction and Destruction of Information Systems
1989	IRIS12	Skagen	Denmark	Creativity and Systems Development
1988	IRIS11	Røros	Norway	Empirical Research
1987	IRIS10	Tampere	Finland	No Theme
1986	9th Scandinavian Research Seminar on Systemeering	Lund	Sweden	Quality of Work versus Quality of Information Systems
1985	8th Scandinavian Research Seminar on Systemeering	Aarhus	Denmark	No Theme
1984	7th Scandinavian Research Seminar on Systemeering	Helsinki	Finland	No Theme
1983	6th Scandinavian Research Seminar on Systemeering	Øystese	Norway	Human Perspective in Systemeering
1982	5th Scandinavian Research Seminar on Systemeering	Stockholm	Sweden	Information Formalization in Organizational Contexts
1981	4th Scandinavian Research Seminar on Systemeering	Oulu	Finland	No Theme
1980	3rd Scandinavian Research Seminar on Systemeering	Saarijärvi	Finland	No Theme
1979	2nd Scandinavian Research Seminar on Systemeering	Dragsfjärd	Finland	Appraisal of the PSC Model for Systemeering
1978	1st Scandinavian Research Seminar on Systemeering	Tampere	Finland	No Theme

== Scandinavian Journal of Information Systems (SJIS) ==
The Scandinavian Journal of Information Systems is a peer-reviewed journal of the IRIS Association and one of the official journals of the Association for Information Systems. Currently, SJIS is published by the electronic library of the Association for Information Systems. The journal historically focused on critical studies of information systems development and use and their impact on society. SJIS also emphasizes research methods traditionally associated with the Nordic region, such as participatory research and design science. However, the journal attracts authors and readers from around the world. Over the years, the journal has published several seminal articles on design science research, critical perspectives on information systems development, and IT strategy by prominent information systems scholars including Alan Hevner, Lucy Suchman, Juhani Iivari, and Claudio Ciborra.

The idea to create a journal connected to the IRIS Association was discussed as early as 1984 during the IRIS conference in Helsinki. The inaugural issue of SJIS was published in 1989. SJIS editorial board consists of four rotating editors representing the four IRIS countries. The editors are appointed by the IRIS executive board. The first Editor-in-Chief of the journal was Lars Mathiassen.

== See also ==
- Information Systems Research
- International Conference on Information Systems
- European Conference on Information Systems
- University of Turku
- Roskilde University
- Tampere University
