= Jay Nunamaker =

American academic

- Born: August 27, 1937 (age 89); Pittsburgh, Pennsylvania
- Known for: Collaboration Technology; Electronic Meeting System
- Scientific career
- Fields: information systems Computer science Communication; Engineering
- Workplaces: University of Arizona; Purdue University; Carnegie Mellon University; University of Pittsburgh; Case Institute of Technology

Jay F. Nunamaker Jr. (born August 27, 1937) is Regents Professor and Soldwedel Professor at the University of Arizona. Regents Professor is the highest faculty rank bestowed at the university, an honor reserved for the top 3% of scholars.

He founded both the MIS department (ranked top 5 in the country by U.S. News & World Report for the past 20 years) in 1974, and the Center for the Management of Information in 1985 at the University of Arizona.

== Biography ==
Nunamaker has served as major professor to over 80 doctoral students from 1968–present. Students that currently hold, or have held, positions at Harvard, University of Michigan, Indiana University, University of Iowa, University of Florida, University of Georgia, University of Washington, Carnegie Mellon University, Texas A&M University, University of Hawaii, and other top MIS institutions.

Jay Nunamaker has been featured in the July 1997 Forbes magazine issue on technology as one of eight key innovators in information technology.

In 2002, he was the recipient of the LEO (lifetime achievement) Award from the Association of Information Systems, at ICIS in Barcelona, Spain.

In a 2005 article in Communications of the Association for Information Systems, he was recognized as one of the most productive information systems researchers, ranking no. 4 to 6 for the period from 1991-2003 based on the number of papers in top IS journals.

== Work ==
His multidisciplinary research is built on a foundation of computer supported collaboration, decision support, deception detection and determination of intent.

Nunamaker's research has led to major breakthroughs in collaboration, decision support systems, and automated systems analysis and design, and he is known for testing his theories and systems in the “real world.”

He built the first operational decision support center in 1985; there are over 2,500 decision centers in industry, government and universities using the GroupSystems software developed at the University of Arizona.

His research on group support systems addresses behavioral as well as engineering issues and focuses on theory as well as implementation.

== Publications ==
His publications span more than 250 papers and seven books, and editorial positions on major journals, in computer science and engineering, information management, communication, security informatics.
