= Rudy Hirschheim =

Rudolf A. (Rudy) Hirschheim is the Ourso Family Distinguished Professor of Information Systems in the E.J. Ourso College of Business at Louisiana State University. Hirschheim is a top-ranking information systems researcher, notable for his research on information systems development and outsourcing.

== Career ==
Hirschheim received a PhD in information systems from the London School of Economics in 1985. He went on to be on the faculties of the University of Houston, Templeton College (University of Oxford), London School of Economics, and McMaster University. He has written several books, among them Information Systems Development and Data Modeling - Conceptual and Philosophical Foundations, with Kalle Lyytinen and Heinz Klein, published by Cambridge University Press in 1995/2008. Hirschheim is a recipient of the Leo award, the Association for Information Systems's highest honor. He has received honorary doctorates from the University of Oulu and the University of Bern.
