= Per Flensburg =

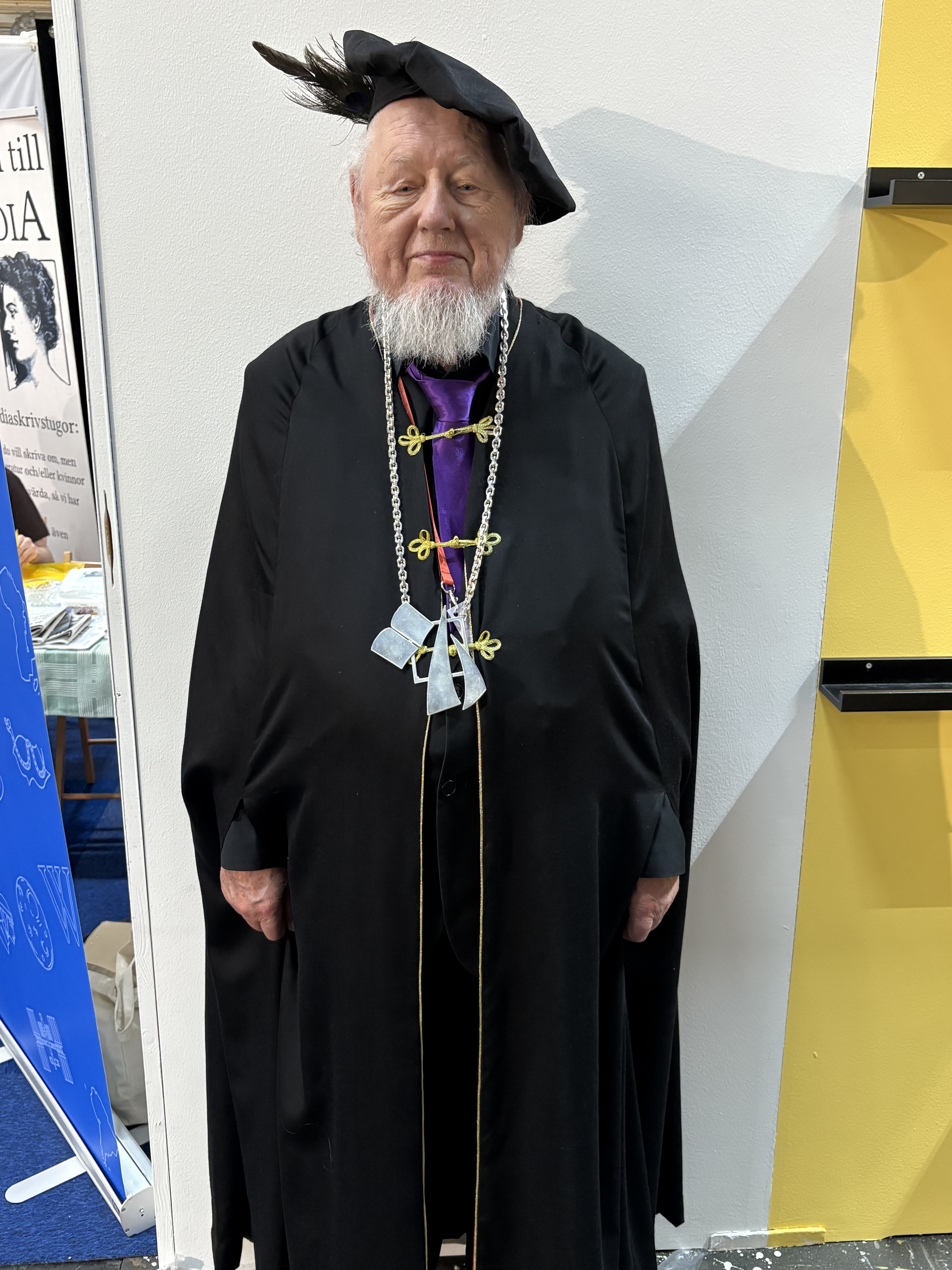
- Per Flensburg as headmaster of Strömstad akademi
- Born: 1946
- Education: Lund University
- Occupation: Professor of Informatics
- Years active: 1986-present
- Employer: University College West
- Known for: Knowledge Spillover, Knowledge Management, Systems Development Consulting
- Website: http://www.perflensburg.se/

Per Flensburg is a Swedish author, researcher, and former professor at University College West. In a paper on Information Systems Research in Scandinavia he was named as one of the top 5 authors in this field based on his extensive research output.

== History ==
In 1986 Flensburg defended his doctoral thesis End User Computing - introduction, consequences, possibilities at Lund University. That same year he became a member of the teaching staff at Copenhagen Business School. In 1996, he began to work for Växjö University where he was appointed Professor in 2002. Per Flensburg joined the faculty as a Professor of Informatics at University College West in 2006. He retired in 2013 and is from 2018 teacher in informatics and headmaster at Strömstad akademi.

== Research ==
As a researcher Flensburg has primarily focused on user participation in the development of information systems. He has published numerous articles and books, among these "Knowledge Spillovers And Knowledge Management", co-edited with Charlie Karlsson and Sven Ake Horte, which became widely receipted among an interdisciplinary research community. Although he has spent some time on the different problems that arise when users of varying backgrounds and paradigms interpret specific terms in an information system differently. Along with heading research at the various universities for which he worked, Flensburg was also a research leader of CeLeKT Research Center. He has written a thesis about paradigm shift in information systems.

== Teaching ==
Flensburg has devoted a lot of effort to education.

== See also ==
- Information Systems Research in Scandinavia
- Knowledge Spillover
- University College West
