= Americas Conference on Information Systems =

- Abbreviation: AMCIS
- Discipline: Information systems

Publication details
- Publisher: Association for Information Systems
- History: 1995–present
- Frequency: annual

The Americas Conference on Information Systems (AMCIS) is an annual conference for information systems and information technology academics and professionals sponsored by the Association for Information Systems. AMCIS is widely considered to be one of the most prestigious conferences for IS/IT in the Western Hemisphere, and provides a platform for panel discussions and the presentation of peer-reviewed information systems research papers. The conference attracts over 600 submissions each year, and those that are selected for presentation appear in the AMCIS Proceedings, which are distributed to hundreds of libraries throughout the world.

The first AMCIS conference took place in 1995 in Pittsburgh and is notable for being the first IS/IT conference to utilize electronic paper submissions. Since that time, AMCIS has been held every August in different cities and attracts between 800 and 1,200 registered delegates every year. In 2006, AMCIS was held in Acapulco, Mexico, thereby marking a major milestone for the conference insofar as it was the first time AMCIS has been held outside of the United States. In 2008, AMCIS was held in Toronto, Canada, and, in 2012, in Lima, Peru. A Portuguese-language track was added in 2008. This continued in 2009 at the San Francisco conference and was a large component of the 2010 Lima conference.

== AMCIS venues ==
Year	Venue	City	State	Country
1995	Pittsburgh Hilton (Now the Wyndham Grand Pittsburgh)	Pittsburgh	Pennsylvania	United States
1996	Hilton at South Mountain	Phoenix	Arizona	United States
1997	Indiana Convention Center	Indianapolis	Indiana	United States
1998		Baltimore	Maryland	United States
1999		Milwaukee	Wisconsin	United States
2000	Westin Hotel, Long Beach	Long Beach	California	United States
2001	Westin Hotel, Boston	Boston	Massachusetts	United States
2002	Hyatt Regency Dallas At Reunion	Dallas	Texas	United States
2003	Marriott Waterside	Tampa	Florida	United States
2004		New York City	New York	United States
2005	Hilton Omaha	Omaha	Nebraska	United States
2006		Acapulco, Mexico	Guerrero	Mexico
2007	Keystone Resort and Conference Center	Keystone, Colorado	Colorado	United States
2008	Sheraton Centre Toronto	Toronto, Canada	Ontario	Canada
2009		San Francisco	California	United States
2010		Lima, Peru	Lima Province	Peru
2011		Detroit	Michigan	United States
2012	Sheraton Seattle	Seattle, August 9–12	Washington	United States
2013	Hilton Chicago	Chicago, August 9–12	Illinois	United States
2014	Savannah International Trade & Convention Center	Savannah, August 7–10	Georgia	United States
2015	The El Conquistador Resort and Convention Center	Puerto Rico, August 13-15	Puerto Rico	United States
2016	Sheraton San Diego Hotel and Marina	San Diego, August 11–13	California	United States
2017	Sheraton Boston Hotel	Boston, August 10-12	Massachusetts	United States
2018	Hyatt Regency New Orleans	New Orleans, August 16-18	Louisiana	United States
2019	Cancún International Convention Center	Cancún, August 15-17	Quintana Roo	Mexico
2020	Virtual	Salt Lake City, August 13-15	Utah	United States
2021	Virtual	Montreal	Quebec	Canada
2022	Virtual	Minneapolis, August 10-14	Minnesota	United States
2023	The Westin Playa Bonita Panama	Panama City, August 10-12	Panama City	Panama
2024	The Grand America Hotel	Salt Lake City, August 15-17	Utah	United States
2025	Fairmont The Queen Elizabeth	Montreal, August 14-16	Quebec	Canada
