= Systèmes d'Information et Management =

French Journal of Management Information Systems
- Discipline: Information technology
- Language: French
- Edited by: Claudio Vitari (Aix Marseille University)

Publication details
- History: 1996-present
- Publisher: Eska (France)
- Frequency: Quarterly

Standard abbreviations
- ISO 4: Syst. Inf. Manag.

Indexing
- ISSN: 1260-4984

Links
- Journal homepage; Affiliation Association Site

The French Journal of Management Information Systems (SIM) is a French peer-reviewed academic journal, published by Eska (Paris), that covers theoretical and empirical research in the areas of information systems and information technology. Topics include computer science, operations research, design science, organization theory and behavior, knowledge management, enterprise system, cloud computing, IS architecture, IT and health, data analysis and management. The chief editor is Professor Claudio Vitari (Aix Marseille University) and it is affiliated with the Association Information & Management.

SIM is a French-language journal dedicated to the study of information systems as they pertain to organizational management. Published quarterly, it is affiliated with the AIM scientific association and upholds the ethical standards outlined in the national charter of academic research activities and the policies of the Association for Information Systems.

With a rigorous scientific approach, SIM welcomes submissions in both French and English, adhering to internationally recognized standards of excellence. The journal serves as a platform for scholarly discourse on digital transformation and its managerial implications, focusing on several key objectives:

- Evaluation and characterization of information systems throughout their lifecycle, from conception to implementation and utilization
- Examination of the organizational changes brought about by information systems
- Analysis of emerging business models in the digital age and their evolution
- Exploration of information processes employed by stakeholders in various activities, including monitoring, communication, knowledge creation, and enrichment.

Within this framework, French Journal of Management Information Systems addresses a range of topics, including information systems strategy, knowledge management, the financial aspects of information technologies, the evolving role of IT within organizations, changes in work processes, organizational transformation, and ethical considerations. The journal also delves into the impact of digital technologies on work, organizational structures, governance, management, and business models.

In line with international standards, French Journal of Management Information Systems embraces a variety of methodological approaches, including quantitative, qualitative, conceptual, action-oriented, clinical, experimental, and simulation-based research. Articles are selected based on their significant contributions to knowledge and their relevance to educators, researchers, and professionals in the field.

== Editors ==
The following persons are or have been editors-in-chief of the journal:

- Frantz Rowe 1996-2008
- Yves Pigneur 2009-2012
- Régis Meissonier 2013-2018
- François de Corbière 2019-2023
- Claudio Vitari 2024-2026

== Origins ==
The journal was founded in 1996 under the initiative of Frantz Rowe and Robert Reix, and it is published by the Eska publishing house. The journal is produced by an editor-in-chief, an editorial board, a scientific committee, and a publication committee. It receives support from the Association Information et Management (AIM).

== Thematic ==
The journal focuses on theoretical and empirical research in the fields of information systems and information technology. Topics covered include computer science, operations research, design science, organizational theory and behavior, knowledge management, enterprise systems, cloud computing, and information systems architecture.

== See also ==
- Association Information et Management
- Association for Information Systems
