= Suzanne Rivard =

Canadian information technology scientist

- Born: 1952 (age 73–74)

Academic background
- Education: MBA, HEC Montréal; PhD, Information Systems, 1983, University of Western Ontario
- Thesis: User developed computer-based applications: a model of the factors of success. (1983)

Academic work
- Institutions: HEC Montréal

Suzanne Rivard FRSC (born 1952) is a Canadian information technology scientist. She is a full professor in the Department of Information Technology at HEC Montréal.

== Early life and education ==
Rivard was born in 1952. She completed her MBA at HEC Montréal and her PhD in Information Systems at the University of Western Ontario. She was the first Canadian to earn her PhD in information systems management and wrote her thesis on the emerging use of computers outside the limited circle of programmers.

== Career ==
Rivard joined the faculty at HEC Montréal in 1978. She co-authored A Keyword Classification Scheme for IS Research Literature: An Update with Henri Barki and Jean Talbot in 1993 which was subsequently adopted by the Management Information Systems Quarterly (MIS Quarterly) journal. Following this, Rivard became the director of the Centre for Interuniversity Research and Analysis on Organizations (CIRANO) technology group.

Rivard was appointed the Chair of Strategic Management of Information Technologies in 2002 "to contribute to the development and dissemination of knowledge on the capacity of companies to choose, deploy and implement information technologies in order to have a real impact on organizational performance." While serving in this role, Rivard was elected a Fellow of the Royal Society of Canada and awarded the Marcel Vincent Award for her outstanding contribution to advancing scientific knowledge in her field. She continued to collaborate with Barki and Talbot and co-authored A multi-level investigation of information technology outsourcing. Their paper, which won the Best Article of 2012 Award, proposed and tested a model of the information technology outsourcing decision.

As a result of her academic accomplishments, Rivard was appointed an associate editor of the Journal of Strategic Information Systems and elected as a Fellow of the Association for Information Systems. She was also recognized as being among the most prolific authors of MIS Quarterly and received the Pierre Laurin Award for excellence in research.
