= AIS Transactions on Human-Computer Interaction =

- Discipline: Information systems
- Language: English
- Edited by: Dennis Galletta, Joe Valacich, Fiona Nah

Publication details
- History: 2009–present
- Publisher: Association for Information Systems
- Frequency: Quarterly
- Open access: Yes

Standard abbreviations
- ISO 4: AIS Trans. Hum.-Comput. Interact.

Indexing
- ISSN: 1944-3900
- LCCN: 2008213795
- OCLC no.: 819363534

Links
- Journal homepage; Online access

AIS Transactions on Human-Computer Interaction is a quarterly peer-reviewed scientific journal covering research on human–computer interactions. It was established by Ping Zhang and Dennis Galletta in 2009 and is published by the Association for Information Systems.

== Editors-in-chief ==
The following persons have been editors-in-chief of the journal:

- Ping Zhang, Syracuse University (2008–2013)
- Dennis Galletta, University of Pittsburgh (2008–2018)
- Joe Valacich, University of Arizona (2013–2015)
- Paul Benjamin Lowry, Virginia Tech (2016–2018)
- Fiona Nah, Missouri University of Science and Technology (2019–present)
