= Salford Business School =

Manchester business school

Coordinates: 53°29′04″N 2°16′17″W

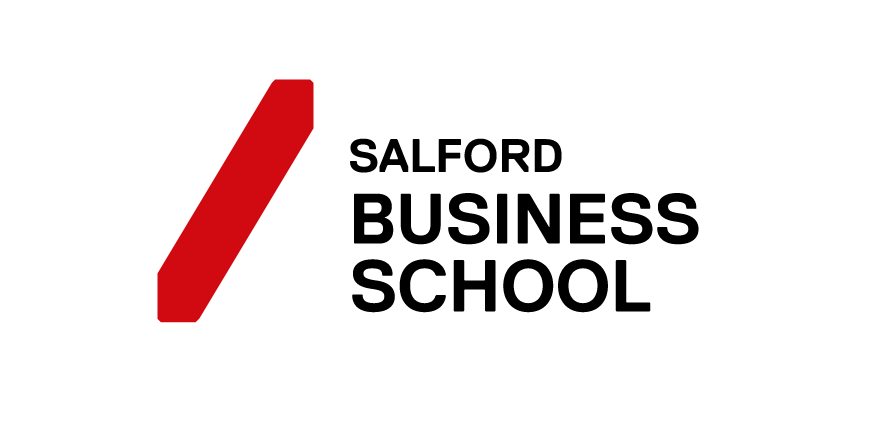
- Motto: Altiora Petamus "Let us seek higher things"
- Type: public university business school
- Established: 2006 (1987 origins of departments)
- Affiliations: University of Salford
- Dean: Dr. Janice Allan
- Students: over 3,000
- Location: Salford, Greater Manchester, England, UK
- Campus: Urban, Parkland
Colours
Navy, Black, White and Gold
- Website: University of Salford Manchester

Professor Amanda Broderick, Dean of Salford Business School, receives the Small Business Charter Award at 10 Downing Street from Sir Peter Bonfield (centre) and David Young, Baron Young of Graffham, in 2011.

Salford Business School is located 3 km west of Manchester city centre in the Maxwell Building on the Peel Park Campus of the University of Salford. As a business school it offers business management courses, business services and business focused research. It is one of the university's four constituent schools.

The range of business and management studies degrees includes pre-masters courses, undergraduate programmes, postgraduate taught and research degrees up to PhD level. It places equal emphasis on teaching, research and academic enterprise measured by National Student Survey and Research Assessment Exercise results.

Teaching and research expertise falls within the areas of:

- International Finance, Accounting & Economics
- International Strategic & People Management
- International Marketing & Services Management
- International Operations & Information Management

The Students' Union clubs and societies include a Students in Free Enterprise (SIFE) group which works closely with the school delivering events including business games for local schools and colleges.

== History ==
The school was formed in 2006 by the merger of four academic units, the School of Management, School of Accounting, Economics and Management Science, School of Leisure, Hospitality and Food Management and the Information Systems Institute. The University of Salford received its Royal Charter in 1967 but has a long tradition of higher education dating back to 1896 when two Workings Men's Institutes merged to form the Salford Technical Institute.

== Undergraduate programmes ==
The School offers 18 honours degrees including Business and Management Studies, Finance and Accounting, Business Information Technology and Leisure, Hospitality and Tourism Studies. All of these are full-time courses. The honours degrees courses last three years with an option for students on all courses to take a placement year between the second and final year of academic work.

The School also delivers a one-year full-time honours degree intended for students who have completed their studies to the equivalent level of a Diploma of Higher Education and a full-time Graduate Certificate for students who do not have the required academic or language standards required by the School's master's degrees. There are also two part-time programmes (Certificate of Higher Education and Graduate Certificate) intended for individuals who have work experience but no formal higher education qualifications.

== Postgraduate programmes ==
Most master's degrees have intermediate awards and students can choose to complete a Postgraduate Certificate (PgCert) or Postgraduate Diploma (PgDip). Areas of specialism currently available include International Business, Information Systems, Tourism Management, Human Resource Management and Marketing. All full-time masters courses last for one year or longer if the optional professional placement is selected.

Since September 2012 students enrolling on all of the masters programmes have had the option to do a Business Innovation Project which could include :

- Six Month Work Placement: work-based learning in a suitable organisation
- Assessed Internship: a one-to-three month monitored work or service/volunteer experience
- Live Project: work as part of a team on a live project
- Dissertation: a conventional dissertation of 12,000 to 15,000 words.

=== The Salford MBA ===
In September 2009 the Salford MBA gained accreditation from Association of MBAs (AMBA). There is a consultancy component within the taught programme where students work with an external organisation to assist in solving a specific organisational issue. The MBA lectures are based at MediaCityUK.

== Research ==
Research in the School is based in a number of centres including:

- Centre for Operations Management, Management Science and Statistics (COMMSS)
- Enterprise and Innovation Research Centre
- Information Systems, Organisations and Society Research Centre (ISOS)
- Marketing and Strategy Research Centre
- Organisational Behaviour and Leadership Research Centre

== Notable Alumni and Former Staff ==
Salford Business School Alumni group on LinkedIn

- Colin Cramphorn, former Chief Constable, West Yorkshire Police
- Rob James-Collier, Actor
- Professor Heinz Klein, Invited Chair and a pioneer in the philosophical foundations of the field of Information Systems
- Tony Lloyd, MP, Manchester Central
- M. Hashem Pesaran, Professor of Economics and Fellow of Trinity College, University of Cambridge
- Su Maozhen, Assistant Manager, Chinese Olympic football team, Beijing Olympics; Chinese Football Association Footballer of the Year (1996); Current head coach of U-20 national team

== See also ==
- List of business schools in Europe
- University of Salford
