= William J. Kettinger =

American computer scientist

William J. (Bill) Kettinger (born ca. 1955) an American computer scientist and is the William S. Lee Distinguished Professor in Management Information Systems at Clemson University, known for his work in the field of business process modelling and business process reengineering.

== Biography ==
Kettinger received his bachelor's degree from Northeastern University in 1976, and his master's degree from the University of Massachusetts Amherst in 1979. At the University of South Carolina in 1991 he received an MS with the thesis, entitled "A Model of Research Communication and Media Selection and Use", and in 1992 his PhD with the thesis entitled "Inter-organizational Computer-based Communication."

Kettinger started his academic career as researcher at the Bureau of Governmental Research and Service of the University of South Carolina. At the universities Management Science Department Moore School of Business appointed assistant professor in 1993, associate professor in 1999 and full professor in 2006.

At the University of South Carolina Kettinger held administrative positions as associate director of the Institute of Information Management from 1982 to 1984; Assistant Dean for Information and Technology Resources at the College of Business Administration from 1989 to 1993; Director of the Center for Information Management and Technology Research (CIMTR) from 1993 to 2004; and PhD Coordinator at the Management Science Department from 2001 to 2006.

== Selected publications ==
- Varun Grover and William J. Kettinger (eds.), Business Process Change: Reengineering Concepts, Methods and Technologies, IDEA Group Publishing Inc, 1995.
- Varun Grover and William J. Kettinger (eds.), Process Think: Winning Perspectives For Business Change in the Information Age, IDEA Group Publishing Inc, 2000.
- Donald A. Marchand, William J. Kettinger and John D. Rollins, Making the Invisible, Visible: How Companies Win with the Right Information, People and IT. John Wiley Publishing, 2001.
- Donald A. Marchand, William J. Kettinger and John D. Rollins. Information Orientation: The Link to Business Performance, Oxford University Press, 2002.

Articles, a selection:

- Kettinger, William J., and Choong C. Lee. "Perceived service quality and user satisfaction with the information services function*." Decision sciences 25.5‐6 (1994): 737-766.
- Grover, Varun, et al. "The implementation of business process reengineering." Journal of Management Information Systems (1995): 109–144.
- Kettinger, William J., James TC Teng, and Subashish Guha. "Business process change: a study of methodologies, techniques, and tools." MIS Quarterly (1997): 55–80.
