= Information Systems (journal) =

- Discipline: Computer science
- Language: English
- Edited by: Felix Naumann, Dennis Shasha, Gottfried Vossen

Publication details
- History: 1975–present
- Publisher: Elsevier
- Frequency: 8/year
- Impact factor: 2.777 (2016)

Standard abbreviations
- ISO 4: Inf. Syst.

Indexing
- CODEN: INSYD6
- ISSN: 0306-4379
- LCCN: 75644522
- OCLC no.: 885211187

Links
- Journal homepage; Online archive

Information Systems is a peer-reviewed scientific journal covering data-intensive technologies underlying database systems, business processes, social media, and data science. It is published 8 times a year by Elsevier. The editors-in-chief are Dennis Shasha (New York University), Gottfried Vossen (University of Münster), and Matthias Weidlich (Humboldt University of Berlin).

== Abstracting and indexing ==
The journal is abstracted and indexed in:

- Cambridge Scientific Abstracts
- Chemical Abstracts Service
- Current Contents/Engineering, Computing & Technology
- Elsevier BIOBASE
- ERIC
- EI/Compendex
- INSPEC
- Library and Information Science Abstracts
- PASCAL
- Science Citation Index
- Scopus
- Zentralblatt MATH

According to the Journal Citation Reports, the journal has a 2016 impact factor of 2.777.
