= John Leslie King =

John Leslie King (born 22 August 1951) is a W.W. Bishop Professor at the University of Michigan School of Information. His main works deal with computerization in the public sector and municipalities, as well as other organizations. He has also worked on privacy issues and some of the primary computerization projects such as project SAGE. He is the author (together with Kalle Lyytinen) of Information systems: the state of the field, published by Wiley in 2006, which, according to WorldCat, is held in 126 libraries. He is a former editor-in-chief of Information Systems Research.

Prof. King has a BA in Philosophy, and graduated with a PhD from the University of California, Irvine School of Administration.
