= University West =

University college in Trollhättan, Sweden

- Högskolan Väst
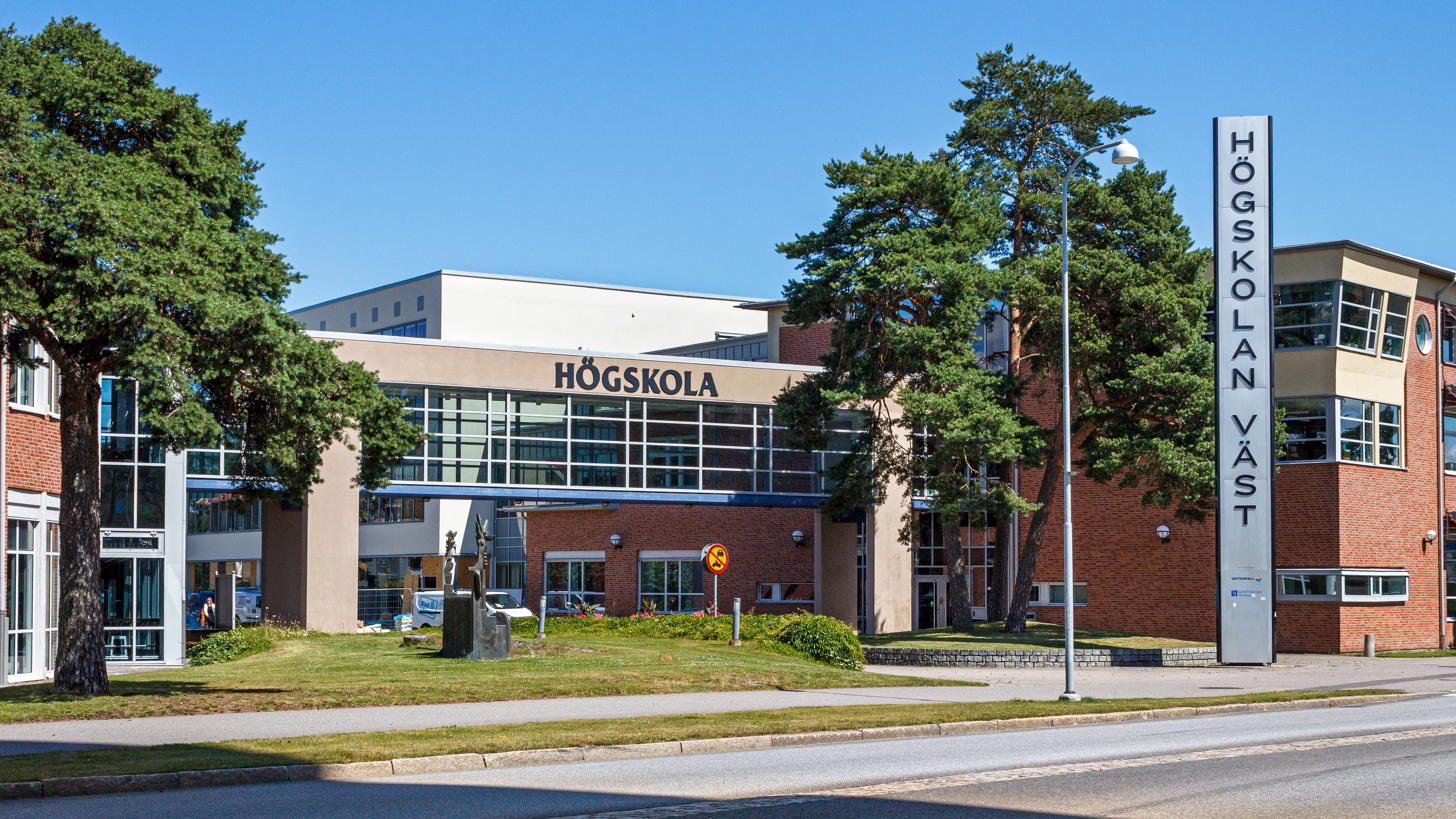
- Motto in English: Our way forward
- Type: Public research university
- Established: 1990; 36 years ago
- Affiliations: STARS EU, IAU, EUA, WACE, SANORD, IAESTE, EAIE
- Vice-Chancellor: Mats Jägstam
- Students: 13 500
- Location: Trollhättan, Västra Götaland County, Sweden; 58.28225°N 12.29285°E
- Campus: urban
- Website: www.hv.se/en/

University West (Swedish: Högskolan Väst) is a university college (högskola) located in Trollhättan, in southwestern Sweden. University West was initially called University College of Trollhättan/Uddevalla (Swedish: Högskolan i Trollhättan/Uddevalla) and had three campuses, in Trollhättan, Uddevalla and Vänersborg. In 2008 all activities were relocated to new facilities in Trollhättan.

== Overview ==
University West offers bachelor's (first cycle), master's (second cycle) and doctoral (third cycle) programmes within a variety of fields like IT, economics and management, health studies, education and engineering. In 2020, there were 27 first cycle programmes and 17 second and third cycle programmes.

As of 2021, there are 13,000 students enrolled and the university employs more than 700 people, including more than 60 professors.

== Work-integrated learning in education and research ==
University West implements work-integrated learning (WIL) in its education and research. The university sees both theoretical and practical knowledge as crucial in education and knowledge creation. Through WIL, students get an opportunity to apply theoretical knowledge to real-life situations and are able to bring back practical experiences into the classroom, thereby improving learning and the student's grasp of his or her field.

University West conducts extensive and internationally recognized research within the field of work-integrated learning and has a unique doctoral programme i WIL. The university is also a member of WACE, an international organisation aimed at strengthening cooperative and work-integrated learning around the world.

== Departments and Schools ==
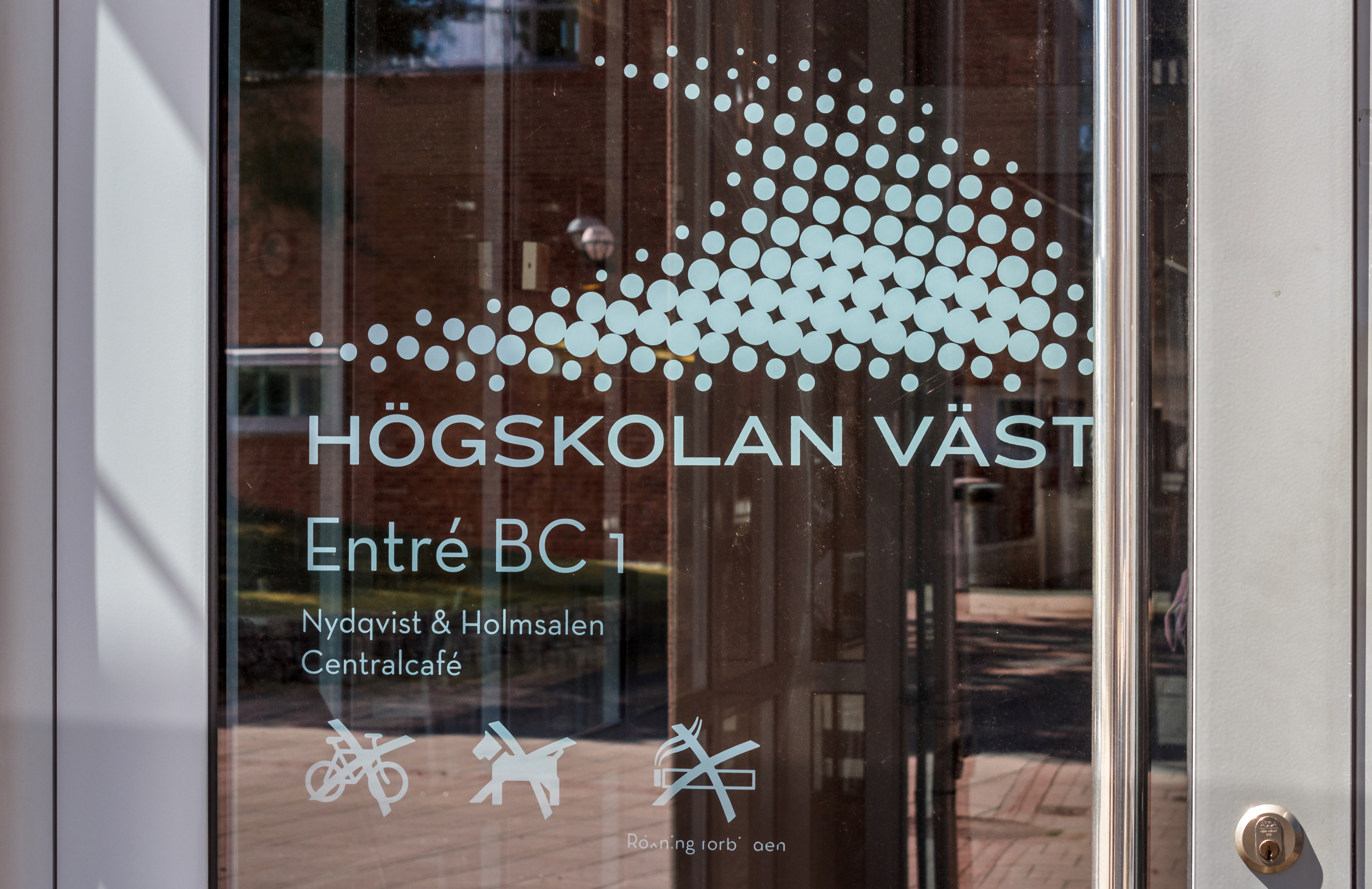
Logo of University West on an entrance

The university consists of four academic departments/schools.

- School of Business, Economics and IT
- Department of Social and Behavioural Studies
- Department of Health Sciences
- Department of Engineering Sciences

The current vice-chancellor of the university is Martin Hellström

== See also ==
- List of universities and colleges in Sweden
