= Andrew B. Whinston =

American economist and computer scientist (born 1936)

- Born: June 3, 1936 (age 90)
- Education: University of Michigan (BA) Carnegie Institute of Technology (MS, PhD)
- Occupations: Economist and computer scientist

Andrew B. Whinston (born June 3, 1936) is an American economist and computer scientist, who holds the Hugh Roy Cullen Centennial Chair in Business Administration. He is a professor of Information Systems, Computer Science, and Economics, and serves as Director of the Center for Research in Electronic Commerce (CREC) in the McCombs School of Business at the University of Texas at Austin.

== Education ==
In 1957, Whinston graduated from the University of Michigan with a Bachelor of Arts, followed by a Master of Science from Carnegie Institute of Technology (now Carnegie Mellon University) in 1960. He completed his PhD at the Carnegie Institute of Technology in 1962, where he was awarded the Alexander Henderson Award for Excellence in Economic Theory in 1960. From 1957 to 1958, Whinston was a Sanxsay Fellow at Princeton University. From 1961 to 1964, he was a member of the Cowles Foundation for Research in Economics at Yale University.

== Career ==
In 1964, Whinston became an associate professor of economics at the University of Virginia, and in 1966, he joined Purdue University as a full professor of economics and management.

In 1962, Whinston published research in the Journal of Political Economy on applications of non-cooperative game theory to microeconomics. In his 1960s paper titled, "A Model of Multi-Period Investment Under Uncertainty", which appeared in Management Science, he used nonlinear optimization to determine optimal portfolios over time.

Whinston has provided expert testimony on electronic commerce policy before the U.S. Congress, including testimony in 1999 before the Senate Subcommittee on Science, Technology, and Space regarding the role of standards in the growth of global electronic commerce.

== Publications ==
The University of Texas at Austin states Whinston has authored over 25 books and 400 peer-reviewed publications. Whinston holds an Erdős number of 2.

== Awards ==
In 2005, Whinston received the LEO Award for Lifetime Exceptional Achievement in Information Systems. This award, created by the Association for Information Systems Council and the International Conference on Information Systems Executive Committee, recognizes outstanding scholars in the field.

In 2009, Whinston received the Career Award for Outstanding Research Contributions at the University of Texas at Austin, which recognizes significant research contributions made by a tenured member. Also in 2009, the INFORMS Information Systems Society (ISS) recognized Whinston as the inaugural INFORMS ISS Fellow for contributions to information systems research.

== Bibliography ==
- Ravi Kalakota; Andrew B. Whinston (1996). Frontiers of Electronic Commerce. Addison-Wesley Publishing Company. ISBN 978-0-201-84520-4.
- Ravi Kalakota; Andrew B. Whinston (1997). Electronic Commerce: A Manager's Guide. Addison-Wesley Professional. ISBN 978-0-201-88067-0.
- Clyde W. Holsapple; Andrew B. Whinston (2013). Recent Developments in Decision Support Systems. Springer Science & Business Media. ISBN 978-3-662-02952-7.

== See also ==
- Chance-constrained portfolio selection
