= Dennis Shasha =

American computer scientist

Dennis Elliot Shasha (born 1955) is an American professor of computer science at the Courant Institute of Mathematical Sciences, a division of New York University. He is also an associate director of NYU WIRELESS. His current areas of research include work done with biologists on pattern discovery for microarrays, combinatorial design, network inference, and protein docking; work done with physicists, musicians, and professionals in finance on algorithms for time series; and work on database applications in untrusted environments. Other areas of interest include database tuning and tree and graph matching.

== Background ==
After graduating from Yale in 1977, he worked for IBM designing circuits and microcode for the IBM 3090. While at IBM, he earned his M.Sc. from Syracuse University in 1980. He completed his Ph.D. in applied mathematics at Harvard in 1984 (thesis advisor: Nat Goodman). Professor Shasha is a prolific author, researcher, tango dancer, climber, and public speaker. He has written six books of puzzles, five of which center on the work of a mathematical detective by the name of Jacob Ecco, a biography about great computer scientists (coauthored by freelance journalist Cathy Lazere), and technical books relating to his various areas of research. In his non-academic writings, perhaps his greatest invention is the notion of "omniheuristics", a kind of super-heuristics concerned with the ability to solve all manner of puzzles, conundrums, enigmas, and dilemmas. Owing to their decidedly curious character, he has given particular note to puzzles that start off easy, but have apparently innocent variants that are particularly perplexing; he calls them 'upstarts'.

Professor Shasha has written monthly puzzle columns for Communications of the ACM, Scientific American, and Dr. Dobb's Journal. He lives in New York with his wife, Karen.

In 2013, he became a Fellow of the Association for Computing Machinery.

== Bibliography ==
=== Dr. Ecco mysteries ===
- The Puzzling Adventures of Dr. Ecco – (1988, Freeman, and republished in 1998 by Dover)
- Codes, Puzzles, and Conspiracy – (1992, Freeman, republished in 2004 by Dover as Dr. Ecco: Mathematical Detective)
- Dr. Ecco's Cyberpuzzles – (2002, W. W. Norton)
- Puzzling Adventures – (2005, W. W. Norton)
- The Puzzler's Elusion – (2006, Avalon Publishing)
- Puzzles for Programmers and Pros – (2007, Wrox)

=== Computer science ===
- Out of their Minds: The Lives and Discoveries of 15 Great Computer Scientists – (1998, Springer)
- Database Tuning: Principles, Experiments, and Troubleshooting Techniques – (2002, Morgan Kaufmann)
- High Performance Discovery in Time Series: techniques and case studies – (2004, Springer Verlag)
- Natural Computing: DNA, Quantum Bits, and the Future of Smart Machines – (2010, W. W. Norton)
- Statistics is Easy: Case Studies on Real Scientific Datasets – (2021, Morgan Claypool)
- Automated Verification of Concurrent Search Structures – (2021, Morgan Claypool)

=== Historical ===
- Red Blues: Voices from the Last Wave of Russian Immigrants – (Holmes & Meier, 2002)
- Iraq's Last Jews: Stories of Daily Life, Upheaval, and Escape from Modern Babylon – (2008, Palgrave Macmillan)
