= Allen S. Lee =

Allen S. Lee is a scholar of Information Systems research best known for his work on integrating positivist and interpretative research methods. Additionally, Allen S. Lee served on the MIS Quarterly editorial board for 15 years, holding the positions of associate editor, senior editor, and editor-in-chief. As an advocate for integrated research approaches, Allen S. Lee has championed equality for interpretative, qualitative and case-study methods in Information Systems research. Recently, Allen S. Lee has also championed design science research as a means of addressing and possibly resolving the rigor vs. relevance conundrum in Information Systems research. As of 2008, Allen S. Lee continues a research agenda which relates and combines qualitative, positivist and interpretive research methods.

== Selected works ==
- 2006: “Does the Use of Computer-Based BPC Tools Contribute to Redesign Effectiveness? Insights From a Hermeneutic Study,” IEEE Transactions on Engineering Management, Volume 53, Number 1, pp. 130–145. Co-author: Suprateek Sarker.
- 2004: “Dialogical Action Research at Omega Corporation,” MIS Quarterly, Volume 28, Number 3, pp. 507–536. Co-author: Pär Mårtensson.
- 2003: “Generalizing Generalizability in Information Systems Research,” Information Systems Research, Volume 14, Number 3, pp. 221–243. Co-author: Richard L. Baskerville.
- 1991: “Integrating Positivist and Interpretive Approaches to Organizational Research,” Organization Science, Volume 2, Number 4, pp. 342–365.
- 1989: “A Scientific Methodology for MIS Case Studies,” MIS Quarterly, Volume 13, Number 1, pp. 33–50.
