= Heinz Klein =

Heinz-Karl Klein
- Died: 18 June 2008
- Education: LMU Munich
- Occupation: Professor

Heinz-Karl Klein (25 November 1939 – 18 June 2008) was a professor and scholar who made fundamental contributions to the philosophical foundations of the field of information systems, and the subfields of systems development, data modeling, and interpretive research in information systems. He is a widely cited scholar in these areas.

Dr. Klein earned his Dipl. Kfm. (equivalent of an MBA) and Ph.D. from the Faculty of Business Administration, LMU Munich. In 1998, he received an honorary doctorate from the University of Oulu for his academic contributions to the development information systems research in Finland. He received the Paper of the Year award for 1999 from MIS Quarterly, the leading journal in the field of information systems.

From 2001 to 2004, he was a doctoral program director at Temple University. In his last years he was Invited Chair at Salford Business School, University of Salford, and adjunct professor at the School of Management of Binghamton University. He has also held a variety of research and teaching appointments at major research Universities in Germany, Canada, Finland, Denmark, New Zealand, and South Africa.
