= Varun Grover (information scientist) =

American Information systems researcher (born 1959)

Varun Grover (born 1959) is an American Information systems researcher, who is the George & Boyce Billingsley Endowed Chair and distinguished professor at the Walton School of Business, University of Arkansas. From 2002 to 2017, he was the William S. Lee (Duke Energy) Distinguished Professor of Information Systems at Clemson University, where he taught doctoral seminars on methods and information systems. He is consistently in the top 3 IS researchers in the world (ranked by volume in top journals). He has an h-index of 100, among the top 5 in his field Grover has around 52,000 citations in Google Scholar and over 13,900 citations in Web of Science.

== Biography ==
Grover received his B.Tech. in electrical engineering in 1982 from the Indian Institute of Technology Delhi, his MBA in 1985 from Southern Illinois University, and his Ph.D. in management information systems in 1990 from the University of Pittsburgh.

After his graduation in New Delhi, Grover started as a marketing analyst in 1982–83. Next in the United States, he was a graduate research assistant at the Southern Illinois University from 1983 to 1985, and at the Katz Graduate School of Business of the University of Pittsburgh from 1985 to 1988. After another year as a lecturer at Pitt, he moved to the University of South Carolina, where he became assistant professor, in 1994 associate professor, and from 1998 to 2001 full professor (BPF professor and distinguished researcher). From 2002 to 2017 he was the William S. Lee (Duke Energy) Chaired full professor at the College of Business & Behavioral Sciences of the Clemson University.

Currently, Grover is the George & Boyce Billingsley Endowed Chair and distinguished professor of IS at the Walton College of Business, University of Arkansas. He is senior editor for MISQ Executive, editor of the Journal of the Association for Information Systems Section on Path Breaking Research, and has served as senior editor for MIS Quarterly (2 terms), the Journal of the AIS (2 terms), and Database. He is also current or former associate and advisory Editor of 15 other journals, including the Journal of MIS, Decision Sciences, Information Systems Research, and Information Systems Journal.

Grover is married. His interests include tennis, world travel, and home electronics. He is a deeply loyal fan of the Pittsburgh Steelers NFL team.

== Research ==
Grover's research interests include IS value, IS strategy, e-business, KM, reengineering, innovation, the effect of IT on the individual in influencing identity and stress, and introspective work on the IS field and its welfare. While his work employs a positivist epistemology, it is not locked into one philosophy or even methodology. He has conducted field surveys, experimental designs, structured interviews, content analysis, secondary data analyses (e.g., strategic group analysis, event studies), field experiments, and modeling. Most of his work has been published in major refereed journals and he recently co-edited three books on IT and process change. He has received a number of research awards and have been consistently recognized as the 1st, 2nd, or 3rd most productive researcher in widely recognized major (A level) IS journals (e.g., MIS Quarterly, Journal of MIS, Information Systems Research) in ten independent published studies and the 2nd most influential researcher based on citation impact in a recent study. Since 1990, he is the 2nd most published researcher in the prestigious AIS "Basket of 6" journals. He has also participated in various prominent roles in national conferences (e.g., ICIS, DSI, AIS) and is involved in leadership roles (e.g., Senior Editorship) in numerous premier journals.

== Publications ==
Grover has integrated information systems and operations management research to produce valuable contributions to both fields. Notable peer-reviewed articles authored/co-authored by Dr. Grover include:

- Grover, Varun; Chiang, Roger H.L.; Liang, Ting-Peng; Zhang, Dongsong (3 April 2018). "Creating Strategic Business Value from Big Data Analytics: A Research Framework". Journal of Management Information Systems. 35 (2): 388–423. doi:10.1080/07421222.2018.1451951. S2CID 49677603.
- Lyytinen, Kalle; Grover, Varun (29 March 2017). "Management Misinformation Systems: A Time to Revisit?". Journal of the Association for Information Systems. 18 (3): 206–230. doi:10.17705/1jais.00453.
- Gerow, Jennifer E; Thatcher, Jason Bennett; Grover, Varun (September 2015). "Six types of IT-business strategic alignment: an investigation of the constructs and their measurement". European Journal of Information Systems. 24 (5): 465–491. doi:10.1057/ejis.2014.6. S2CID 17225679.
- Carter, Michelle; Grover, Varun (4 April 2015). "Me, My Self, and I(T): Conceptualizing Information Technology Identity and its Implications". MIS Quarterly. 39 (4): 931–957. doi:10.25300/MISQ/2015/39.4.9.
- Tams, Stefan; Grover, Varun; Thatcher, Jason (1 December 2014). "Modern information technology in an old workforce: Toward a strategic research agenda". The Journal of Strategic Information Systems. 23 (4): 284–304. doi:10.1016/j.jsis.2014.10.001.
- Grover, Varun; Kohli, Rajiv (2012). "Cocreating IT Value: New Capabilities and Metrics for Multifirm Environments". MIS Quarterly. 36 (1): 225–232. doi:10.2307/41410415. JSTOR 41410415. S2CID 2267088.
- Saeed, Khawaja A.; Malhotra, Manoj K.; Grover, Varun (February 2011). "Interorganizational System Characteristics and Supply Chain Integration: An Empirical Assessment*: Saeed, Malhotra, and Grover". Decision Sciences. 42 (1): 7–42. doi:10.1111/j.1540-5915.2010.00300.x.
- Saeed, Khawaja A.; Grover, Varun; Kettinger, William J.; Guha, Subo (24 May 2011). "The successful implementation of customer relationship management (CRM) system projects". ACM SIGMIS Database. 42 (2): 9–31. doi:10.1145/1989098.1989100. S2CID 18519963.
- Kohli, Rajiv; Grover, Varun (1 January 2008). "Business Value of IT: An Essay on Expanding Research Directions to Keep up with the Times". Journal of the Association for Information Systems. 9 (1): 23–39. doi:10.17705/1jais.00147.
- Papke-Shields, Karen E.; Malhotra, Manoj K.; Grover, Varun (1 September 2006). "Evolution in the strategic manufacturing planning process of organizations". Journal of Operations Management. 24 (5): 421–439. doi:10.1016/j.jom.2005.11.012.
- Saeed, Khawaja A.; Malhotra, Manoj K.; Grover, Varun (August 2005). "Examining the Impact of Interorganizational Systems on Process Efficiency and Sourcing Leverage in Buyer-Supplier Dyads". Decision Sciences. 36 (3): 365–396. doi:10.1111/j.1540-5414.2005.00077.x.
- Sambamurthy, V.; Bharadwaj, Anandhi; Grover, Varun (2003). "Shaping Agility through Digital Options: Reconceptualizing the Role of Information Technology in Contemporary Firms". MIS Quarterly. 27 (2): 237–263. doi:10.2307/30036530. hdl:10654/41542. JSTOR 30036530. S2CID 5974553.
- "General Perspectives on Knowledge Management: Fostering a Research Agenda". Journal of Management Information Systems. 18 (1): 5–21. 31 May 2001. doi:10.1080/07421222.2001.11045672. S2CID 219308314.
- Grover, Varun (May 1993). "An Empirically Derived Model for the Adoption of Customer-based Interorganizational Systems". Decision Sciences. 24 (3): 603–640. doi:10.1111/j.1540-5915.1993.tb01295.x.

In addition to his numerous research articles and book chapters, he has co-authored three books:

- With M. Lynne Markus, Business Process Transformation, Sharpe Publishing Company (Part of the Advances in Management Information Systems Series), Armonk, New York, 2008
- With W.R. Kettinger, ProcessThink: Winning Perspectives for Business Change in the Information Age, Idea Group Publishing, Hershey, PA and London, UK, 2000 (399 pages) ISBN 1-878-28968-3
- With W.R. Kettinger, Business Process Change: Concepts, Methods and Technologies, IDEA Group Publishing, Harrisburg, US, 1995 (704 pages) ISBN 1-878289-29-2

== Recognition ==
Grover's honors include "AIS LEO Awards", which was announced at the International Conference on Information Systems in year 2020. The LEO Award recipients are recognized for their outstanding contribution and global impact within the Information Systems fields and outside the field. He was also awarded Outstanding Faculty Member at the University of Arkansas for "achievement in student engagement, scholarship and research, innovation, and leadership development in 2020. In 2019, he was awarded AIS Distinguished Member Cum Laude at ICIS 2019 in Munich; he was recognized as most published and most cited authors in The Database for Advances in Information Systems,; and he was ranked in the top 5 of AIS Scholars in the 2019 update of the University of Arizona's h-index ranking with a h-index of 85.

In 2018, he received "Best Published Paper Award" in the Organizational Communications and Information Systems (OCIS) Division of the Academy of Management for paper (with K. Lyytinen), "Management Misinformation Systems: A Time to Revist," which was published in the Journal of the Association for Information Systems. In 2017, he was recognized in the top 5 of 400 prominent Management Information Systems (MIS) researchers in the 2017 update of the University of Arizona's h-index ranking. In 2013, he was listed among Highly Cited Researchers from Thomson Reuters and received "Excellence in Graduate Teaching Award: from College of Business & Behavioral Sciences, Clemson University (and 2004).

In 2012, he was selected for 2012 Edition of Who's Who in America; he received "Alumni Award for Outstanding Achievement in Research" which is Clemson University's highest honor for research and Clemson University Board of Trustees "Award for Faculty Excellence". In 2010, he received "AIS Fellow Award" for his "outstanding contributions to the information systems discipline in terms of research, teaching and service". He received the Leadership Development Award from the Global Information Technology Management Association in 2008 and 2011. He received Award for Faculty Excellence from Clemson University Board of Trustees in both 2009 and 2010. He was recognized by PricewaterhouseCoopers "Outsourcing World Achievement Award" in 1999 and 2000. In 1998, he was listed in the 1998 Edition of "International Who's Who in Information Technology". He was selected and listed in "Who's Who of International Professionals" in 1997.
