= Izak Benbasat =

Turkish-Canadian professor and scientist

Izak Benbasat CM is a Turkish–Canadian professor and scientist, currently the Sauder Distinguished Professor of Information Systems and professor of information-system management at the University of British Columbia Sauder School of Business. He is also a published author, being largely cited as a researcher.
