= William Johnson Walsham =

English surgeon (1847–1903)

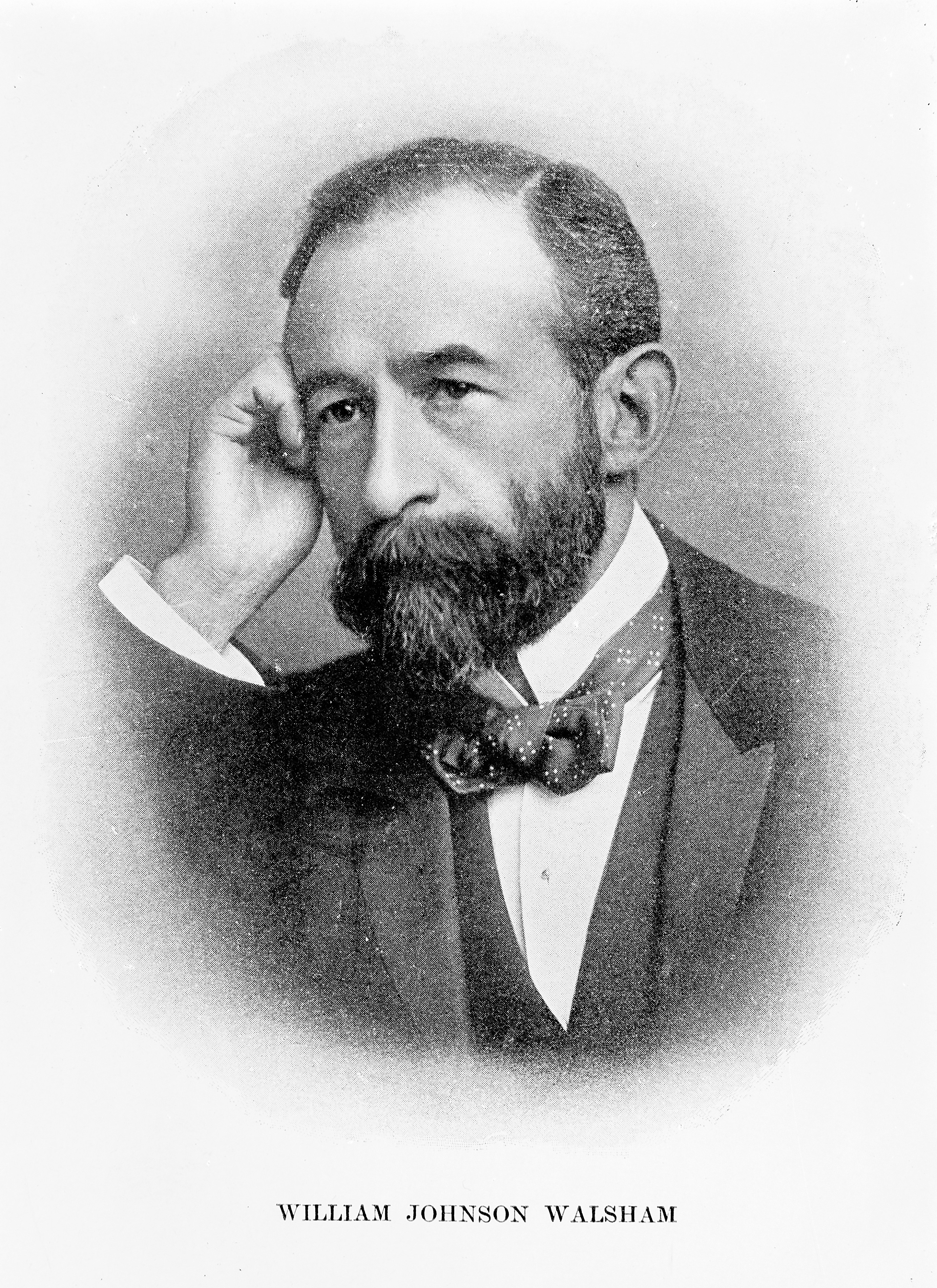
- Born: 27 June 1847; London
- Died: 5 October 1903 (aged 56); London
- Occupation: Surgeon

William Johnson Walsham (27 June 1847 – 5 October 1903) was an English surgeon.

== Biography ==
Walsham was born in London on 27 June 1847, was elder son of William Walker Walsham by his wife Louisa Johnson. Educated privately at Highbury, he early showed a mechanical bent, and was apprenticed to the engineering firm of Messrs. Maudslay. Soon turning to chemistry and then to medicine, he entered St. Bartholomew's Hospital in May 1867, and obtained the chief school prizes in his first and second years of studentship. In 1869 he gained the gold medal given by the Society of Apothecaries for proficiency in materia medica and pharmaceutical chemistry, and in 1870 was admitted a licentiate of the Society of Apothecaries. He then proceeded to Aberdeen, where he graduated M.B. and C.M. in 1871 with the highest honours. Returning to London, he was admitted M.R.C.S. England on 17 November 1871. He served the offices of house physician and of house surgeon at St. Bartholomew's Hospital; in 1872-3 was assistant demonstrator of anatomy in the medical school; full demonstrator 1873–80; demonstrator of practical surgery 1880–9; lecturer on anatomy 1889–97, and lecturer on surgery from 1897. Walsham was appointed assistant surgeon at St. Bartholomew's Hospital on 10 March 1881, and took charge of the orthopaedic department. He became full surgeon in 1897.

At the Metropolitan Hospital he was elected surgeon in 1876, taking charge of the department for diseases of the nose and throat. He became consulting surgeon in 1896. He also served as surgeon to the Hospital for Diseases of the Chest from 1876 to 1884. At the Royal College of Surgeons Walsham was elected a fellow on 10 June 1875, was an examiner in anatomy on the conjoint board in 1892, and in surgery from 1897 to 1902.

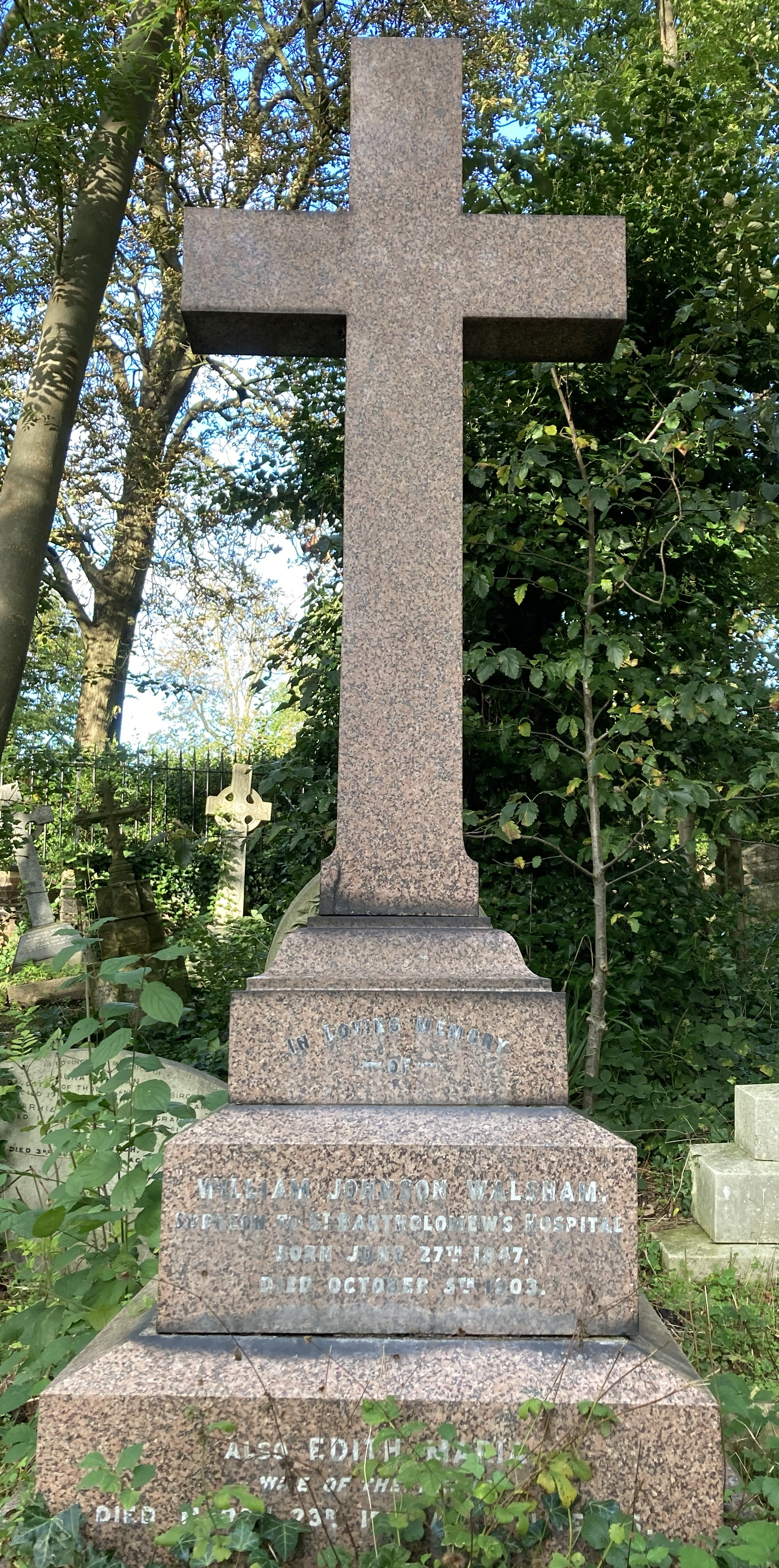
Grave of William Johnson Walsham in Highgate Cemetery

Walsham was a first-rate teacher of medical students. As a pupil of Sir John Struthers at Aberdeen, he early turned his attention to dissection, and many of his preparations were preserved at St. Bartholomew's Hospital. As surgical dresser to Sir James Paget he soon learned that pathology is the foundation of modern surgery, and of this fact he never lost sight. Physically delicate, he was unequal to the largest operations in surgery, but he excelled in those which required delicacy of touch, perfect anatomical knowledge, and perseverance, like the plastic operations of harelip and cleft palate and the tedious manipulations of orthopaedic surgery.

He died at 77 Harley Street, London, on 5 October 1903, and was buried at Highgate Cemetery. He married in 1876 Edith, the elder daughter of Joseph Huntley Spencer, but left no issue.

Walsham published:

- 'Surgery: its Theory and Practice,' 1887; 8th edit. 1903; a widely circulated textbook for students.
- 'A Manual of Operative Surgery on the Dead Body,' conjointly with Sir Thomas Smith; 2nd edit. 1876.
- 'A Handbook of Surgical Pathology for the use of Students in the Museum of St. Bartholomew's Hospital,' 1878; 2nd edit., with Mr. D'Arcy Power, 1890.
- 'The Deformities of the Human Foot with their Treatment,' 1895.
- 'Nasal Obstruction: the diagnosis of the various conditions causing it and their treatment,' 1898.

Walsham edited the 'St. Bartholomew's Hospital Reports,' 1887–97, and contributed various articles to Christopher Heath's 'Dictionary of Surgery,' Frederick Treves's 'System of Surgery,' and to Henry Morris's 'Treatise on Anatomy.'
