= Flansburgh =

Flansburgh is a surname. Notable people with the surname include:

- Earl Flansburgh (1931–2009), American architect, father of:
  - John Flansburgh (born 1960), American musician and member of They Might Be Giants
  - Paxus Calta (born 1957), American political activist, born Earl Schuyler Flansburgh

== See also ==
- Scott Flansburg (born 1963), American dubbed "The Human Calculator"
- Flensburg (disambiguation)
