= Strategic information system =

Organizational analytic system

A strategic information system (SIS) is a computer-based system used by organizations to analyse market and competitor information supporting business planning. It is designed to contribute to corporate strategy by aligning organizational objectives with information technology. This alignment is intended to enable organizations to respond effectively to changes in the business environment, particularly shifts in competitive conditions.

In addition, an SIS aims to support managerial decision-making by providing data analytics, trends, and performance metrics. These capabilities are meant to allow managers to more readily identify opportunities, assess risks, and evaluate operational efficiency. By integrating internal organizational processes with external market intelligence, a strategic information system serves to support both day-to-day operational decisions and long-term strategic planning.

== Importance ==
Strategic information systems consolidate data from internal operations and external market variables to assist in long-term planning. The integration of these datasets is supposed to help identify competitive trends and align IT infrastructure with organizational goals.

== Types ==
- Cost strategy: The idea is to help companies reach lower costs through business process engineering, reducing costs from suppliers, and thereby being able to reduce costs to customers.
- Differentiation strategy: SIS involves providing products or services that differ from those of competitors.
- Focus strategy: It helps companies focus on specific products or services within the organization.
- Innovation strategy: It provides products or services with the latest innovations.
- Alliance strategy: It creates cooperative relationships that benefit both suppliers and other companies, even with competitors.
- Growth strategy: It helps companies develop and diversify their market.
- Quality strategy: It helps improve the quality of products and services.
- Market Penetration Strategy: It looks to expand sales of existing products in existing markets through pricing, promotion, or distribution improvements.
- Product Development Strategy: It looks to create new or significantly improved products for existing markets.
- Modern Applications: Strategic information systems increasingly incorporate cloud computing, artificial intelligence, business intelligence, predictive analytics, and big data to support strategic planning. These technologies enable organizations to identify market trends, forecast customer demand, optimize operations, and improve competitive advantage. Modern SIS platforms also integrate real-time dashboards that allow executives to monitor key performance indicators and make data-driven strategic decisions.

== See also ==
- Marketing
