= Arun Rai =

Scientist

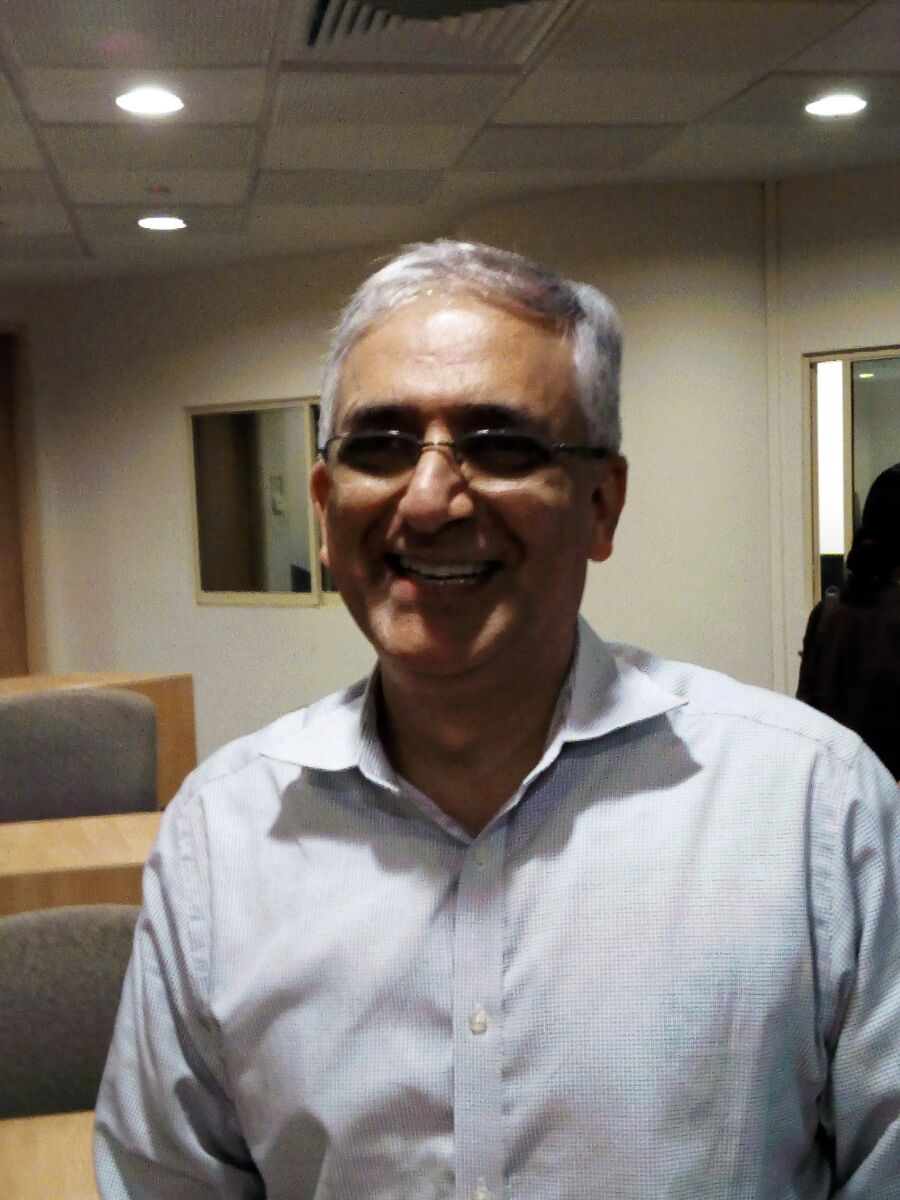
Dr. Arun Rai visiting the NUS in Singapore

Arun Rai (born 1963) is an Indian-born American scientist. Arun Rai is a permanent Regent's Professor at the Robinson College of Business at Georgia State University and holds the Howard S. Starks Distinguished Chair at the Robinson College of Business at Georgia State University.

== Education and Employment ==
Arun Rai earned his integrated master's degree in science and technology from BITS Pilani in 1985, MBA from Clarion University of Pennsylvania in 1987, and PhD in Management Information Systems from Kent State University in 1990. He served as an assistant and later as an associate professor at Southern Illinois University at Carbondale from 1990 until 1997 before moving to Georgia State University in 1997.

== Awards and Recognitions ==
In recognition of his significant global contributions to scientific research in the field of Information Systems, Rai was recognized as the Fellow of the Association of Information Systems (FAIS) in 2010.

Rai was awarded the Information Systems Society (ISS) Distinguished Fellow in 2014.

Arun Rai was the recipient of the prestigious LEO award (awarded in 2019 in Munich), which is named for the world's first business application of computing (The Lyons Electronic Office), and recognizes truly outstanding individuals in the field of Information Systems.

== Service to the Field of Information Systems ==
He served as an editor-in-chief of Management Information Systems Quarterly (MISQ) for five years between 2016 and 2020. He has previously served as senior editor for Information Systems Research, MIS Quarterly, and Journal of Strategic Information Systems and as associate editor for several journals (e.g., Journal of Management Information Systems, Management Science, Decision Sciences, IEEE Transactions on Engineering Management, Information Systems Research, MIS Quarterly and Journal of the Association for Information Systems).
