= Geoff Walsham =

English computer scientist

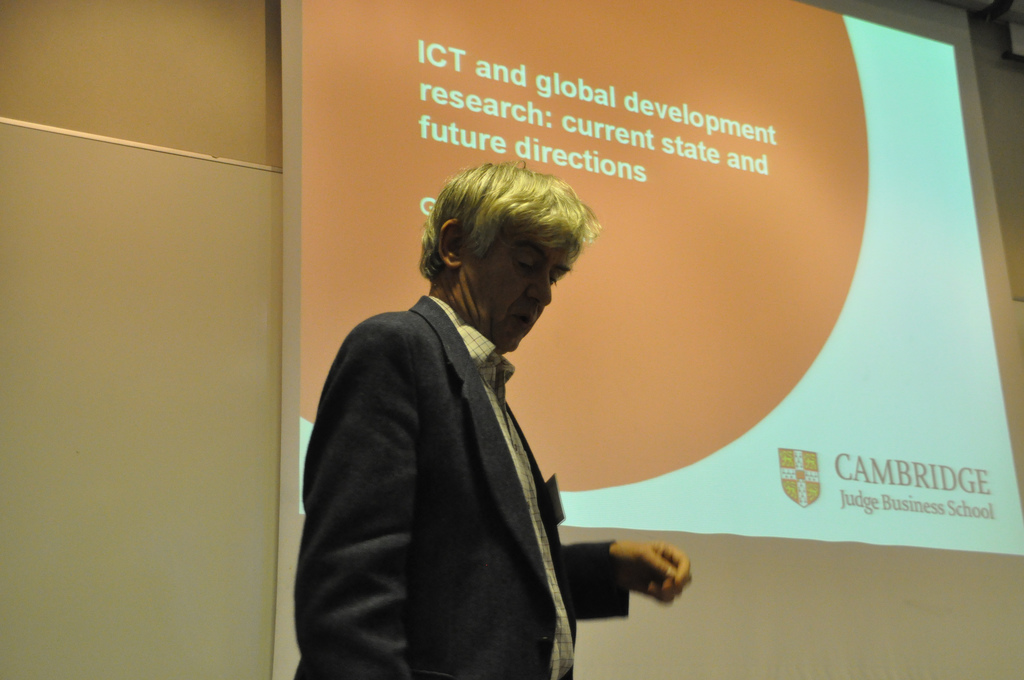
Geoff Walsham.

Geoff Walsham (born 10 June 1946 in Manchester) is an English scholar in the Social Study of Information Systems. He has done much to establish the value and legitimacy of interpretive research in the field of Information Systems, particularly through his book Interpreting Information Systems in Organizations (Wiley, 1993). He has also written extensively about IT in developing countries, including the book Making a World of Difference: IT in a Global Context (Wiley, 2001).

After studying Mathematics at the University of Oxford, he worked as an operational researcher at BP, and later gained an MSc at University of Warwick. He then joined the department of engineering at the University of Cambridge and became one of the founding members of the Judge Business School. He was a professor at the University of Lancaster before returning to Cambridge. He has also lectured in Australia, Kenya, India, and the Philippines.

He is currently an emeritus professor of management studies (information systems) at the Judge Business School.
