= Management Information Systems Quarterly =

- Discipline: Information science, management
- Language: English
- Edited by: Susan Brown

Publication details
- History: 1977-present
- Publisher: Management Information Systems Research Center (United States)
- Frequency: Quarterly
- Impact factor: 5.430 (2017)

Standard abbreviations
- ISO 4: Manag. Inf. Syst. Q.

Indexing
- CODEN: MISQDP
- ISSN: 0276-7783 (print); 2162-9730 (web)
- LCCN: 85652044
- JSTOR: misquarterly
- OCLC no.: 805082941

Links
- Journal homepage; Online access; Online archive

Management Information Systems Quarterly, referred to as MIS Quarterly, is an online-only quarterly peer-reviewed academic journal that covers research in management information systems and information technology. It was established in 1977 and is considered a major periodical in the information systems industry. An official journal of the Association for Information Systems, it is published by the Management Information Systems Research Center at the University of Minnesota. The current editor-in-chief is Susan Brown, University of Arizona.

The journal had the highest impact factor (4.978) of all peer-reviewed academic journals in the field of business from 1992 to 2005. According to the Journal Citation Reports, the journal has a 2015 impact factor of 5.384.

== Editors-in-chief ==
Past editors-in-chief in order of succession have been:

- Gary W. Dickson (1977-1982)
- William R. King (1983-1985)
- Warren McFarlan (1986-1988)
- James Emery (1989-1991)
- Blake Ives (1992-1994)
- Robert Zmud (1995-1998)
- Allen Lee (1999-2001)
- Ron Weber (2002-2004)
- Carol Saunders (2005-2007)
- Detmar Straub (2008-2012)
- Paulo Goes (2013-2015)
- Arun Rai (2016-2020)
- Andrew Burton-Jones (2021-2023)
- Susan Brown (2024-Present)

== See also ==
- Information Systems Research
- Journal of Management Information Systems
- Journal of the Association for Information Systems
- Journal of Information Technology
