= International Conference on Information Systems =

- Abbreviation: ICIS
- Discipline: Information systems

Publication details
- Publisher: Association for Information Systems
- History: 1980–present
- Frequency: annual

International Conference on Information Systems (ICIS) is an annual international conference for academics and research-oriented practitioners in the area of information systems. Previously known as the Conference on Information Systems (CIS), ICIS is the flagship conference of the Association for Information Systems, an international professional organization serving academics in information systems.

ICIS was founded in 1980 at the University of California, Los Angeles, and the first conference was held in Philadelphia the same year. Starting in 1990, when it had its first international venue in Copenhagen, ICIS has been traditionally held outside of North America regularly. ICIS currently rotates between the Americas (AIS Region 1), Europe/Middle East/Africa (AIS Region 2), and Asia/Australia (AIS Region 3). ICIS is usually scheduled in early December and lasts for four days.

The conference is preceded by the ICIS Doctoral Consortium, held off site, usually in a nearby resort. The consortium brings together senior faculty from Information Systems (many of whom were participants in past consortia) and approximately 40 doctoral students, selected from some 120 nominations; each university or institution is allowed to nominate only one participant.

== Past and Future Conferences ==
List of ICIS Conferences
Year	Location	AIS Region
2022	Copenhagen, Denmark	Region 2 (Europe/MiddleEast/Africa)
2021	Austin, Texas, US	Region 1 (Americas)
2020	Virtual conference	not applicable
2019	Munich, Germany	Region 2 (Europe/MiddleEast/Africa)
2018	San Francisco, California, US	Region 1 (Americas)
2017	Seoul, South Korea	Region 3 (Asia/Australia/Pacific)
2016	Dublin, Ireland	Region 2 (Europe/MiddleEast/Africa)
2015	Fort Worth, Texas, US	Region 1 (Americas)
2014	Auckland, New Zealand	Region 3 (Asia/Australia/Pacific)
2013	Milan, Italy	Region 2 (Europe/MiddleEast/Africa)
2012	Orlando, Florida, US	Region 1 (Americas)
2011	Shanghai, China	Region 3 (Asia/Australia/Pacific)
2010	St. Louis, Missouri, US	Region 1 (Americas)
2009	Phoenix, Arizona, US	Region 1 (Americas)
2008	Paris, France	Region 2 (Europe/MiddleEast/Africa)
2007	Montreal, Quebec, Canada	Region 1 (Americas)
2006	Milwaukee, Wisconsin, US	Region 1 (Americas)
2005	Las Vegas, Nevada, US	Region 1 (Americas)
2004	Washington, DC, US	Region 1 (Americas)
2003	Seattle, Washington, US	Region 1 (Americas)
2002	Barcelona, Spain	Region 2 (Europe/MiddleEast/Africa)
2001	New Orleans, Louisiana, US	Region 1 (Americas)
2000	Brisbane, Australia	Region 3 (Asia/Australia/Pacific)
1999	Charlotte, North Carolina, US	Region 1 (Americas)
1998	Helsinki, Finland	Region 2 (Europe/MiddleEast/Africa)
1997	Atlanta, Georgia, US	Region 1 (Americas)
1996	Cleveland, Ohio, US	Region 1 (Americas)
1995	Amsterdam, Netherlands	Region 2 (Europe/MiddleEast/Africa)
1994	Vancouver, British Columbia, Canada	Region 1 (Americas)
1993	Orlando, Florida, US	Region 1 (Americas)
1992	Dallas, Texas, US	Region 1 (Americas)
1991	New York City, New York, US	Region 1 (Americas)
1990	Copenhagen, Denmark	Region 2 (Europe/MiddleEast/Africa)
1989	Boston, Massachusetts, US	Region 1 (Americas)
1988	Minneapolis, Minnesota, US	Region 1 (Americas)
1987	Pittsburgh, Pennsylvania, US	Region 1 (Americas)
1986	San Diego, California, US	Region 1 (Americas)
1985	Indianapolis, Indiana, US	Region 1 (Americas)
1984	Tucson, Arizona, US	Region 1 (Americas)
1983	Houston, Texas, US	Region 1 (Americas)
1982	Ann Arbor, Michigan, US	Region 1 (Americas)
1981	Cambridge, Massachusetts, US	Region 1 (Americas)
1980	Philadelphia, Pennsylvania, US	Region 1 (Americas)
