= Xiaomi Mi Band =

Wearable activity tracker

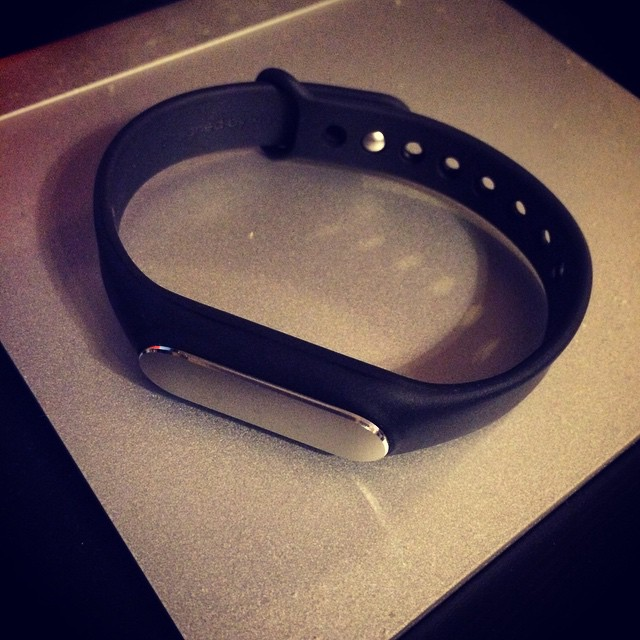
- Also known as: MI Smart Band
- Developer: Xiaomi
- Manufacturer: Foxconn
- Product family: Xiaomi Mi
- Type: Fitness Tracker
- Released: July 22, 2014
- Units sold: 13M
- Operating system: MI Band OS
- System on a chip: Dialog SmartBond DA14580
- Memory: 512KB RAM, 16MB storage
- Display: Type: AMOLED; Size: 1.56-inch Resolution: 152x486 pixels Pixel Density: 326ppi
- Connectivity: Bluetooth 4.0
- Power: 41.01 mAh
- Online services: Google Play; F-Droid
- Dimensions: 152x486 pixels
- Weight: 13 g (0.46 oz)
- Successor: Xiaomi Mi Band 1S; Xiaomi Mi Band 2 Xiaomi Mi Band 3 Xiaomi Mi Band 4 Xiaomi Mi Band 5 Xiaomi Mi Band 6 Xiaomi Smart Band 7 Xiaomi Smart Band 8 Xiaomi Smart Band 9 Xiaomi Smart Band 10
- Website: www.mi.com/global/product-list/bands/band/

The Xiaomi Mi Band is a wearable activity tracker produced by Xiaomi, unveiled during a Xiaomi launch event on 22 July 2014. This article is mainly about the original Mi Band; later versions have separate articles.

== Design ==
The Mi Band resembles a bracelet in its design, and can be worn on either hand. The band's location can be set using the official Mi Band app called Mi Fit, later replaced by Mi Health and subsequently renamed to Zepp Life.

The band contains the core tracker which is around 9 mm thick, and 36 mm in length. It is inserted into a TPSiV wristband, which is hypoallergenic and has anti-UV and anti-microbal properties. The tracker is inserted into the charger module, which can be connected to a 5.0 V external power source. It is also called "Xiaomi Fit".

== Specifications ==
- Fitness monitor and sleep tracker
- Sleep-cycle smart alarm
- Unlock your Android without a password
- 14-day standby power
- Water resistant (IP67)
- Vibrate alert (call and notification)

== Software compatibility ==
At the time of launch, the only official way to use Mi Band was to use the Xiaomi's Mi Fit app although third-party software such as gadgetbridge do exist.

== Later models ==
Xiaomi announced the Mi Band 1S, or the Mi Band Pulse, the successor to the Mi Band, on 7 of November 2015. It is almost identical to its predecessor, with the addition of a heart rate sensor on the bottom of the band, making it slightly bulkier at 37 x 13.6 x 9.9mm. The addition of the heart rate sensor seemed to have decreased battery endurance, which claimed to be 30 days of use from one charge. In reality, the battery generally dies by 15 days. Heart rate on the 1S is measured on demand, it does not offer continuous monitoring.

Other models followed, with the Mi Band 2 in 2016, the Mi Band 3, the Mi Band 4, Mi Band 5, Mi Band 6, Mi Band 7 and Xiaomi Smart Band 8. An app named "Zepp Life", by the manufacturer of the Xiaomi fitness tracking wrist band, is available on the Google Play Store. A later application called Mi Health was made available for Xiaomi phones running the MIUI user interface.

== Privacy issues ==
Researchers from the University of Toronto found in 2016 that most fitness trackers, including the Xiaomi Mi Band and its app (version 1.6.122), were transmitting a range of personal data, including the email address of the user's contacts, geolocation, the phone's serial number, and information entered by the wearer regarding food intake, menstruation, pregnancy, etc. Xiaomi did not indicate how long the company retained user data on its servers after the termination of an account.
