= Allegiance (company) =

Voice of customer and enterprise feedback management technology platform

Allegiance Software, Inc
- Type: Private
- Industry: (VoC) and (EFM) Technology
- Founded: 2005
- Headquarters: Lehi, Utah
- Key people: Carine Clark, CEO; Adam Edmunds, Founder
- Website: www.allegiance.com

Allegiance, Inc is a voice of customer (VoC) and enterprise feedback management (EFM) technology platform that let organizations collect and analyze consumer data in real time. The company was recognized for providing large companies and government agencies with a range of big data mining tools, and it was listed as one of the GSA’s approved vendors. Allegiance’s clients include VMware, Citi, AeroMexico, Nalco, Ameriprise, Adobe and Dell, and it was ranked as one of Inc. magazine’s fastest-growing companies.

The company was headquartered in South Jordan, UT.

== History ==
Allegiance was founded in 2005 when the ethics compliance firm SilentWhistle merged with Allegiance Technologies (founded in 2000), a provider of online feedback tools. Adam Edmunds founded the company to provide organizations with more advanced tools for analyzing customer data in real time.

In 2009, Allegiance acquired Inquisite, a provider of online survey software. In 2012, the company raised $12 million in a Series B round of venture financing, which included investors El Dorado Ventures, Rembrandt Venture Partners, and Allegis Capital.

In December 2012, Allegiance announced its appointment of Carine Clark as President and CEO. Formerly SVP and CMO for Symantec, Clark has a long career of building successful software companies.

In November 2014, Allegiance announced it would be acquired by Maritz Holdings, Inc. and merged with Maritz Research to form a new independent company called MaritzCX. MaritzCX announced the closing of the deal on January 14, 2015.

== Products ==
Allegiance provided large organizations with tools for collecting and analyzing customer feedback and translating it into business insights in real-time. The company’s flagship product, the Engage platform, is a feedback management platform that generates "customer intelligence" by drawing insights from multiple channels a client organization uses to connect with customers. The Engage platform is used by several organizations with large customer feedback databases, including JetBlue and AT&T. MaritzCX still offers this platform though it's now simply referred to as the MaritzCX platform.

Now as MaritzCX, the company continues to provide several other products and services, including text analytics, survey engines, online feedback forms, social media feedback, as well as those services offered by Maritz Research including market research and consulting services.

== Awards and recognition ==
Allegiance claims to have won or been nominated for several awards, including:

- Ranked as a 2013 Service leader by CRM Magazine
- Won the TMC Innovation Labs award for the Allegiance Spotlight platform in 2012
- Won the Communications Solutions Product of the Year award for the Engage platform in 2011
- CEO Adam Edmunds was selected as a finalist for the Ernst & Young Entrepreneur of the Year in 2010
- Ranked as one of Inc. magazine’s fastest-growing companies in 2009
- Won the Communications Solutions Product of the Year award in 2009

== See also ==
- Voice of Customer (VoC)
- Enterprise Feedback Management (EFM)
- Customer Experience (CX)
- Customer Feedback Management Services
- Customer Relationship Management (CRM)
- Customer Satisfaction
- Loyalty Business Model
- Net Promoter Score (NPS)
