= Mobile location analytics =

Mobile location analytics (MLA) is a type of customer intelligence and refers to technology for retailers, including developing aggregate reports used to reduce waiting times at checkouts, improving store layouts, and understanding consumer shopping patterns. The reports are generated by recognizing the Wi-Fi or Bluetooth addresses of cell phones as they interact with store networks.

By seeing the movement of devices, retailers can gather data that will help them optimize such things as floor plan layouts, advertisement placement and checkout lane staffing. MLA products work by capturing a device's MAC address, the unique 12-digit number that is assigned to a specific hardware device. This number can be detected by Wi-Fi or Bluetooth sensors. There are separate MAC addresses for Wi-Fi and Bluetooth. Beacons are also used for MLA purposes and they work with Bluetooth. Through this technology, they are also able to send push notifications. Recently companies started using the combination of Wi-Fi and Bluetooth to improve accuracy and reliability of the MLA devices. The technology works as people walk through stores; the tracking companies find their wireless signal and assign the device a random number. They monitor that number as it moves across the screen and analyze patterns in the data.

== Characteristics ==
Because of the use of the automatically transmitted MAC address, the customers need not be logged into the shops' Wi-Fi or website. This feature is highlighted in the alternative term "offline tracking" (as opposed to online tracking) that is sometimes used for "MLA" e.g. in Germany.

== Uses ==
A number of industries can benefit from MLA services including retail, real estate, energy, insurance, manufacturing, healthcare, government, planning, and public safety. For example, retail businesses can compare sales revenue and evaluate marketing campaign effectiveness. Businesses can determine where to open stores and distribute their products. MLA is also beneficial for emergency cases. Hospitals can determine demand for new vaccines or make sense of sudden disease outbreaks. This is possible because every information system, desktop solution, or mobile app can take advantage of the location.

The physical stores have tools to collect data on their shoppers by monitoring their movement and their pauses. Video monitoring can provide up to 10,000 data points per store visitor. This allows stores to develop heat maps so they can put the items they want to sell in high traffic areas. If a mobile device is stolen by theft, this can be found by police by tracing the mobile number.

== In-store analytics ==
According to a study, brick-and-mortars accounts for 93% of sales. Therefore, the retail store remains a critical focus.

In-store analytics has become more like online store analytics. Using MLA, stores can see where shoppers go and where they linger, detect whether they are shopping alone or with friends or children, and match shopping to weather. One company with small stores located in malls found that the space just inside the entry was a dead zone, so they moved the popular items further inside the store. Another store couldn’t tell which display sold more effectively because they had duplicate inventory. They were about to remove the wall displays when they decided to check traffic with a Mobile Location Analytics company. After creating a heat map, they made the floor displays smaller and easier for customers to walk through to reach the wall displays. The stores want analytics to see if the displays erected at the end of aisles eat away the sales of the same item stacked halfway down the aisle or if they contribute to additional sales.

MLA-based counts can help ensure stores are staffed appropriately for the traffic at all times of the day. It helps businesses make correlations between transaction data and traffic.

== Privacy concerns ==
The privacy agreement comes at a time when brick-and-mortar retailers are eager to have access to the kind of information about consumer behavior that can match Web retailers like Amazon. The move also reflects how industry is responding to public concern over the collection of personal data. As companies increasingly use data in more robust ways such as targeting online ads or tracking physical location, they are realizing the need to give users more control over how data is used.

Although products dealing with mobile location analytics do not record personally identifiable information about specific customers, they have generated concerns about customer data integration and consumer privacy. Several MLA companies have worked with United States Senator, Charles Schemer and the Future of Privacy Forum to develop a smart phone tracking code of conduct. Under the voluntary code of conduct, MLA vendors and retailers will inform customers when they are being tracked and allow individual customers to opt out.

== Problems reusing Wi-Fi access points ==
Most Wi-Fi router or wireless access point vendors provide an API for listening the device's MAC address of the signals to identify smartphones, this is the base of vendors of Wi-Fi tracking and analytics systems, but almost all new smartphones emit more than one MAC address when they are not connected to the Wi-Fi. An iPhone can produce a lot of different and/or false MAC addresses when visit a venue during 30–40 minutes, because every time a user touches the screen and awakes the phone from sleep mode, the MAC address changes.

Wi-Fi tracking solution vendors are dealing with data based on these false MAC addresses if they try to detect not associated devices, and only if the smartphone connects to the Wi-Fi access point to have free internet access (then it is associated) they can detected the true MAC address of the iPhone. But few customers use the free internet service - in general less than 10-20%.

== See also ==
- Business intelligence
- Customer data management
- Electric beacon
- Geofencing
- Information privacy
