= Kampyle (software) =

Israeli software company

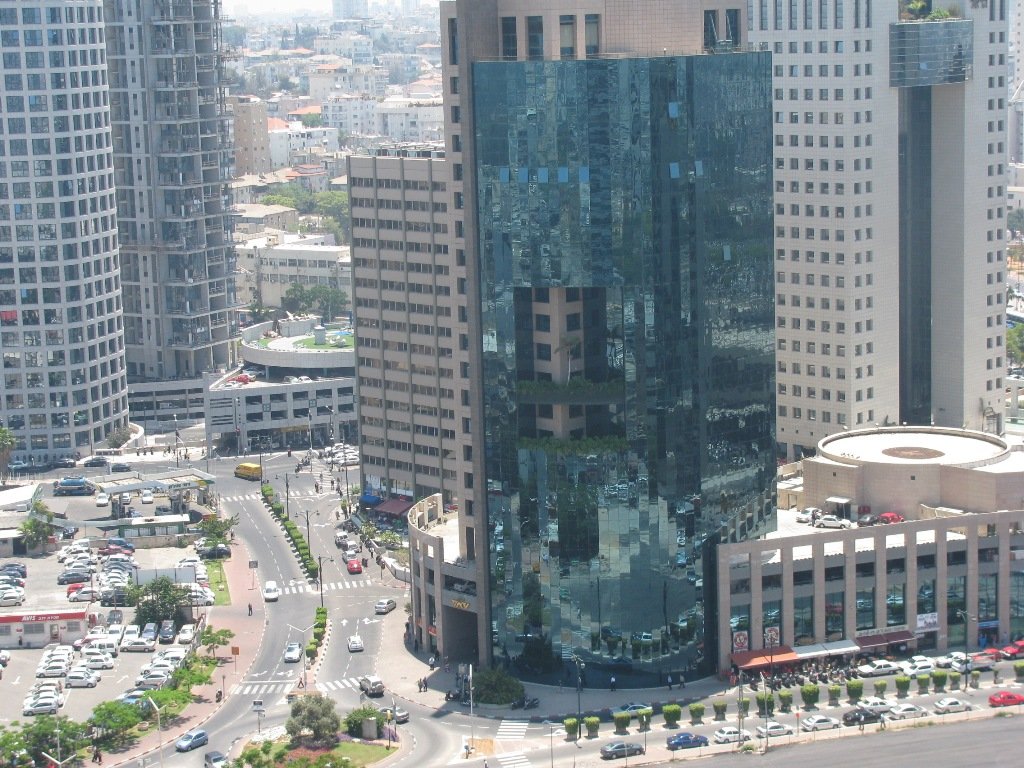
- The Kampyle development center is located in the Diamond Exchange District in Tel Aviv, Israel.
- Type: Private
- Industry: Internet, computer software
- Founded: 2007
- Headquarters: Ramat Gan, Israel
- Services: Customer feedback management services, lead generation, web analytics
- Website: www.kampyle.com

Kampyle is a software and website feedback analytics company founded in 2007 and based in Ramat Gan, Israel. Kampyle's feedback service is used to improve a company's ability to understand their website users and customer analytics. Kampyle was acquired by Medallia in October 2016.

== Overview ==
The company's instant feedback is enabled in part by the use of a feedback button that can be placed on websites, or a survey as a feedback option. The software also has a rater, whereby users can rate a website per their satisfaction with it on a scale of one to five. Such feedback can enable companies, and webmasters to assess consumer satisfaction with websites and can aid in the discovery of problems on websites. Kampyle's service also enables companies to generate sales lead generation from customers that "identify themselves as sales prospects".

The feedback platform has 60 language translations. In 2008, Kampyle's feedback base was usable in unison with Google Analytics, a web analytics service provided by Google that tracks and reports website traffic, and Nuconomy, enabling "side-by-side analysis of user feedback and website analytics". The company's software is also used on mobile phones and in retail stores.

== History ==
Kampyle was founded in 2007 by Ariel Finkelstein, Eylon Steiner and Eran Savir, and began providing its products to consumers in 2008. The company was acquired by Medallia in October 2016, which later was acquired by Thoma Bravo.

== See also ==
- Customer feedback management services
- Landing page optimization
- Web analytics
- Web usability
