= Xiaomi Mi Smart Band 4 =

Fitness tracker

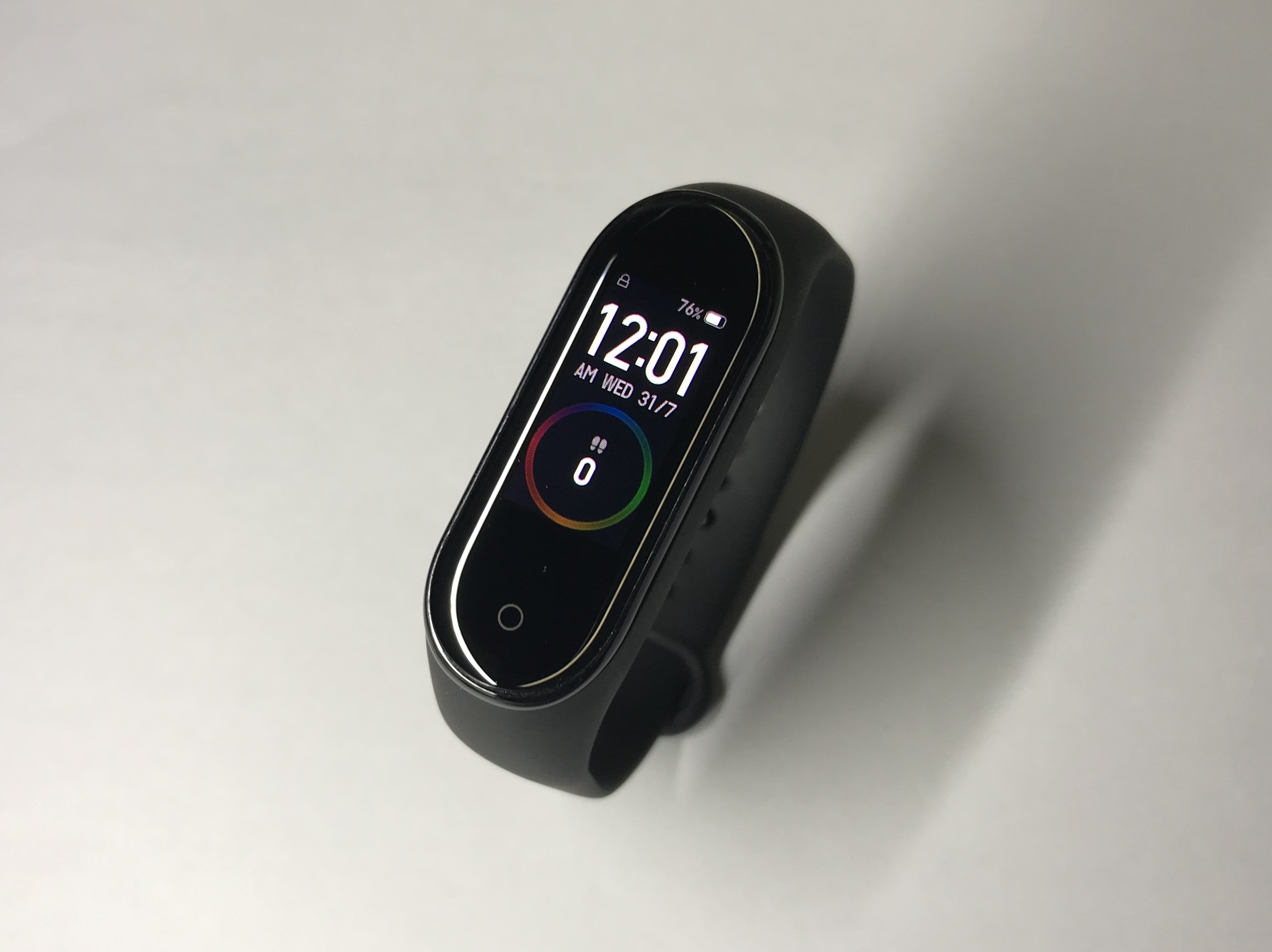
- Developer: Xiaomi
- Manufacturer: Anhui Huami Information Technology Co. Ltd
- Product family: Mi Band
- Type: Activity tracker, Watch
- Generation: 4
- Released: 11 June 2019
- System on a chip: Dialog DA14697
- Memory: 512KB
- Storage: 16MB
- Display: 0.95 inch AMOLED
- Connectivity: Bluetooth 5.0 BLE; NFC in some models.
- Power: 135 mAh
- Weight: 22.1 g
- Predecessor: Xiaomi Mi Band 3
- Successor: Xiaomi Mi Smart Band 5
- Website: Official website

The Xiaomi Mi Smart Band 4 (Xiaomi Mi Band 4 in China) is a wearable activity tracker produced by Xiaomi Inc released in China on 16 June 2019, in Europe on 26 June 2019 and in India on 19 September 2019. It is 39.9% larger than its predecessor, has a super capacitive AMOLED display and features 24/7 heart rate monitoring.

== Specifications ==
Specifications:

- Display: 0.95 inch AMOLED, full color touch screen;
- Colour depth: 24bit;
- Screen brightness: Up to 400 nits;
- Resolution: 120 x 240;
- Button: Single touch button (wake up, go back);
- Connectivity: Bluetooth version 5.0 BLE; NFC on some models;
- Mass: 22.1 g;
- RAM: 512KB;
- Storage: 16MB:
- Battery: LiPo, 135mAh, 20 days of battery life;
- Sensors: accelerometer, gyroscope, PPG heart rate sensor, capacitive proximity sensor;
- Waterproof: up to 50 metres, 5 atmospheres

== See also ==
- Xiaomi
- Xiaomi Mi Band
- Xiaomi Mi Band 2
- Xiaomi Mi Band 3
- Xiaomi Mi Smart Band 5
