= Vivek Kundra =

American government official

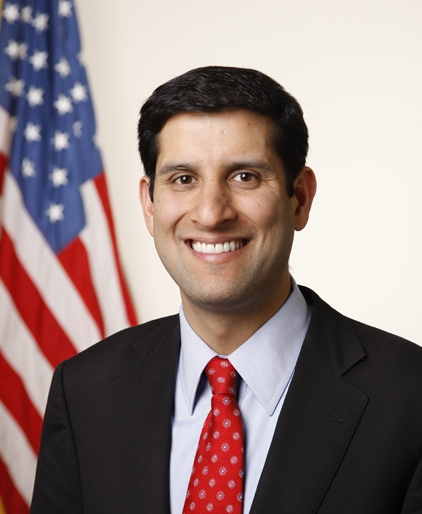

1st Chief Information Officer of the United States
- In office March 5, 2009 – August 4, 2011
- President: Barack Obama
- Preceded by: Karen Evans (Administrator of the Office of Electronic Government and Information Technology)
- Succeeded by: Steven VanRoekel

Personal details
- Born: October 9, 1974 (age 52) New Delhi, India
- Education: University of Maryland, College Park (BS); University of Maryland, University College (MS)

Vivek Kundra (born October 9, 1974) is an American former administrator who served as the first chief information officer of the United States from March, 2009 to August, 2011 under President Barack Obama. He is currently Chief Operating Officer at the Trade Desk, a provider of advertising technology software based in New York City. He was the chief operating officer at Sprinklr, a provider of enterprise customer experience management software based in New York City. He was previously a visiting Fellow at Harvard University.

He previously served in D.C. mayor Adrian Fenty's cabinet as the District's chief technology officer and in Virginia governor Tim Kaine's cabinet as Assistant Secretary of Commerce and Technology.

== Early life and education ==
Kundra was born in New Delhi, India, on October 9, 1974. He moved to Tanzania with his family at the age of one, when his father joined a group of professors and teachers to provide education to local residents. Kundra learned Swahili as his first language, in addition to Hindi and English. His family moved to the Washington, D.C. metropolitan area when he was eleven.

Kundra attended college at the University of Maryland, College Park, where he received a degree in psychology. He earned a master's degree in information technology, from the University of Maryland University College. Additionally, he is a graduate of the University of Virginia's Sorensen Institute for Political Leadership.

== Career ==
Kundra is currently the chief operating officer at Sprinklr, a provider of enterprise customer experience management software based in NYC.

Previously, Kundra served as director of Infrastructure Technology for Arlington County, Virginia, starting September 11, 2001.

Governor Tim Kaine appointed Kundra in January 2006 to the post of Assistant Secretary of Commerce and Technology for Virginia, the first dual cabinet role in the state's history.

Mayor Adrian Fenty appointed him on March 27, 2007, to the cabinet post of chief technology officer (CTO) for the District of Columbia. Kundra worked on developing programs to spur open source and crowdsourced applications using publicly accessible Web services from the District of Columbia. Building on the work of Suzanne Peck, who preceded him as DC's CTO and created the D.C. Data Catalog, he used that data as the source material for an initiative called Apps for Democracy. The contest yielded 47 web, iPhone and Facebook applications from residents in 30 days. Mayor Fenty stated that the program cost the District "50 thousand dollars total and we estimate that we will save the district millions of dollars in program development costs". This cost-benefit was claimed by the D.C. government as savings in internal operational and contractual costs. Taking a page from Kundra this initiative was mirrored by New York City's mayor Michael Bloomberg in launching a "BigApps" contest housed at NYC BigApps as well as New York City's DataMine. The city of San Francisco launched a data portal similar DC's in 2009.

Kundra won recognition for the project management system he implemented for the District government. The system imagined projects as publicly traded companies, project schedules as quarterly reports, and user satisfaction as stock prices. Buying or selling a stock corresponded to adding resources to a project or taking them away. The goal of management was to optimize the project portfolio for return on investment. The system effectively replaced subjective judgments about projects with objective, data driven analytics.

Kundra's efforts to use cloud-based web applications in the D.C. government have also been considered innovative. Following the D.C. example driven by Kundra, the city of Los Angeles is now taking steps to adopt the cloud computing model for its IT needs. A D.C. spokeswoman said that the District of Columbia paid $479,560 for the Enterprise Google Apps license, which is $3.5 million less than what it had planned to spend on an alternative plan. Since its deployment in July 2008 Google Apps is available to 38,000 D.C. city employees, but only 1,000–2,000 are actively using Google Docs. Only 200 employees are actively using Gmail. In late 2010, hoping to spur use of Gmail, the city ran a pilot program, selecting about 300 users and having them use the Google product for three months. Google participated closely in the project, but Gmail ultimately didn't pass the "as good or better" test with the users, who preferred Exchange/Outlook. In July 2011, the General Services Administration (GSA) became the first federal agency to migrate its email services for 17,000 employees and contractors to the cloud-based Google Apps for Government, saving $15.2 million over 5 years. As of July 2011, government agencies in 42 states are leveraging cloud-based messaging and collaboration services.

The first major cloud project during his tenure was GSA's migration of e-mail/Lotus Notes to the Gmail and Salesforce.com's platform. GSA awarded a contract for e-mail in December 2010 and a five-year contract to Salesforce in August 2011. A September 2012 Inspector General report found the savings and cost analysis not verifiable and recommended GSA update its cost analysis. GSA office of CIO was unable to provide documentation supporting its analysis regarding the initial projected savings for government staffing and contractor support. The audit found that the agency could neither verify those savings nor clearly determine if the cloud migration is meeting agency expectations despite initial claims that indicated 50% cost savings

Kundra also moved the city's geographic information systems department to a middle school.

=== Federal Chief Information Officer (CIO) ===
Before his appointment as CIO, Mr. Kundra served as technology adviser on President Barack Obama's transition team. Kundra was officially named by President Obama on March 5, 2009, to the post of Federal CIO.

The Federal chief information officer is responsible for directing the policy and strategic planning of federal information technology investments as well as for oversight of federal technology spending. Until Kundra, the position had previously been more limited within the Office of Management and Budget where a federal chief information officer role had been created by the E-Government Act of 2002. The Federal CIO establishes and oversees enterprise architecture to ensure system interoperability and information sharing and maintains information security and privacy across the federal government. According to President Obama, as chief information officer, Kundra "will play a key role in making sure our government is running in the most secure, open, and efficient way possible". To further President Obama's overall technology agenda, Vivek Kundra, Jeffrey Zients, the chief performance officer, and Aneesh Chopra, the chief technology officer, will work closely together. Kundra and Chopra previously worked in Governor Tim Kaine's administration.

Kundra made it a priority to focus on the following areas:

- Cybersecurity
- Ensuring openness and transparency
- Innovation
- Lowering the cost of government
- Participatory democracy

One of his first projects was the launch of Data.gov, a site for access to raw government data. Another project launched by Kundra in June 2009 was the Federal IT Dashboard, which gives an assessment (in terms of cost, schedule and CIO ranking) of many large government IT projects.

==== Democratizing data ====
Kundra launched the Data.gov platform on May 21, 2009 with the goal of providing public access to raw datasets generated by the Executive Branch of the Federal Government to enable public participation and private sector innovation. Data.gov draws conceptual parallels from the DC Data Catalog launched by Kundra when he was CTO of Washington, D.C., where he published vast amounts of datasets for public use. Immediately after the Data.gov launch, the Apps for America contest by the Sunlight Foundation challenged the American people to develop innovative solutions using Data.gov. San Francisco, the City of New York, the State of California, the State of Utah, the State of Michigan, and the Commonwealth of Massachusetts have launched public access websites modeled after Data.gov. Internationally, over 46 countries have launched open data sites patterned after Data.Gov, some using the U.S. Data.gov software which was made open source and made available on GitHub. Additionally, states, cities and counties have launched sites, notablysome cities in Canada, and the UK are following suit.

==== IT Dashboard ====
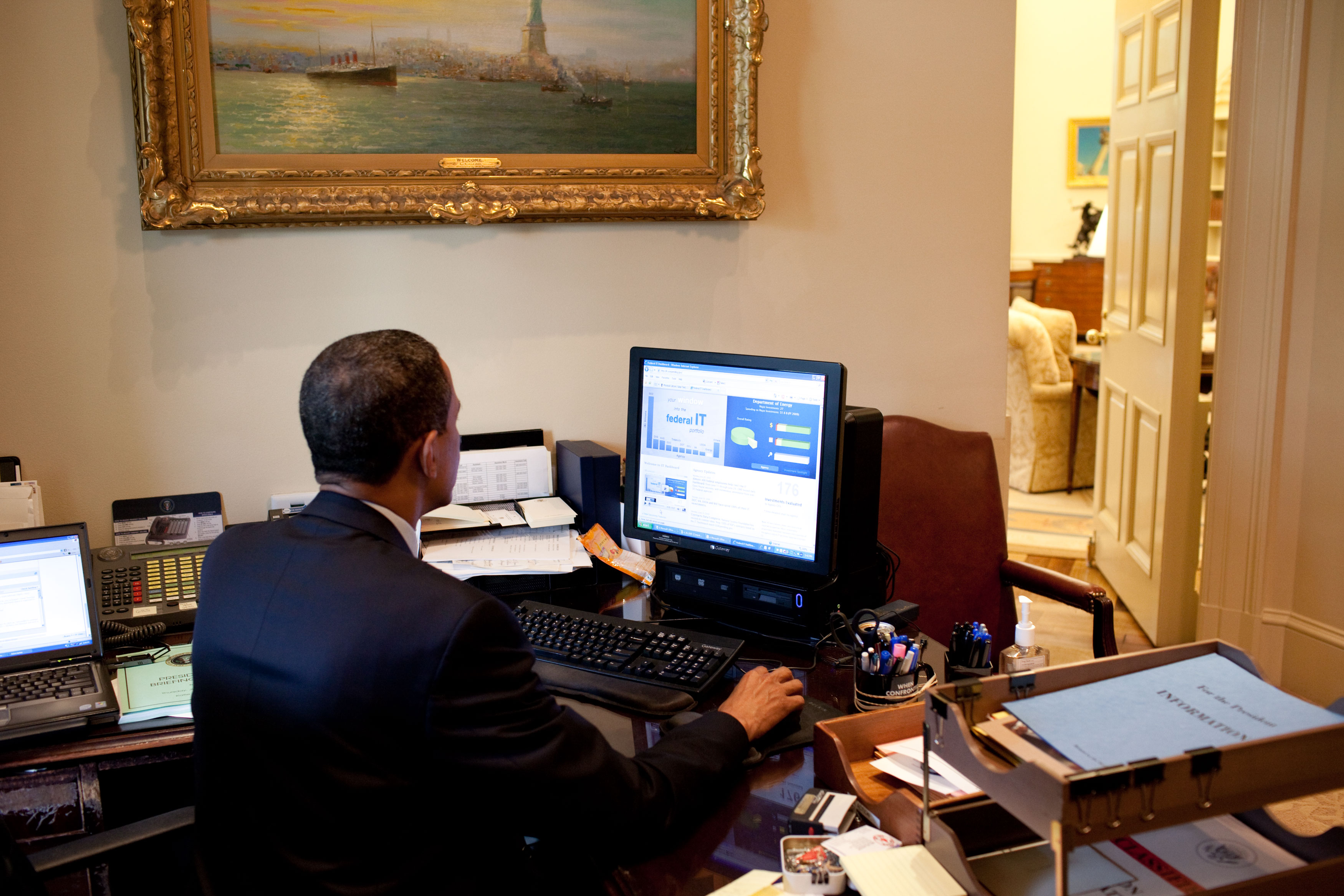
President Barack Obama testing the IT Dashboard

On June 30, 2009, at the Personal Democracy Forum in New York, Vivek Kundra, unveiled the IT Dashboard that tracks over $76 billion in Federal IT spending. The IT Dashboard is part of USASpending.gov to track all government spending. The IT Dashboard is designed to provide CIOs of individual government agencies, the public and agency leaders unprecedented visibility into the operations and performance of Federal IT investments (spending), and the ability to provide and receive direct feedback to those directly accountable. In January 2010, Kundra followed up the work on the IT Dashboard with TechStat accountability sessions. These sessions are designed to turn around, halt or terminate at-risk and failing IT projects in the federal government. It allows agency CIOs, CFOs, and other key stakeholders to find solutions for IT projects that are over budget, behind schedule, or under-performing.

==== Cloud computing ====
Kundra launched the federal government strategy and the cloud computing portal Apps.gov at NASA's Ames Research Center, Moffett Field in California, on September 15, 2009. Apps.gov is a new service provided by the GSA where federal agencies can subscribe to IT services. Kundra saw the cloud as an alternative to hardware investments, as means to reduce IT costs, and to shift focus of federal IT from infrastructure management to strategic projects. This initiative aims to use commercially derived technologies to promote software tools, vast data storage and data sharing, and to foster collaboration across all federal agencies. Howard Schmidt, White House cybersecurity coordinator, will work closely with the Federal CIO and CTO with respect to cloud initiatives and has the responsibility of orchestrating all cybersecurity activities across the government.

On December 9, 2010, Kundra published the "25 Point Implementation Plan to Reform Federal Information Technology Management", which included Cloud First as one of its top priorities for achieving IT efficiency. Cloud First required each agency to identify three cloud initiatives. He announced his decision to leave the federal government and join Harvard University within 7 months of this strategy, too short for any of cloud first initiatives to have demonstrated cost savings. After a short 5 months at Harvard he left to join Salesforce.com, a cloud SaaS and PaaS provider.

==== Management reforms ====
Kundra published a 25-point implementation plan to reform how the federal government manages information technology. The execution plan follows his decision to reevaluate some of the government's most troubled IT projects. Of 38 projects reviewed, four have been canceled, 11 have been rescoped, and 12 have cut the time for delivery of functionality down by more than half, from two to three years down to an average of 8 months, achieving a total of $3 billion in lifecycle budget reductions, according to whitehouse.gov

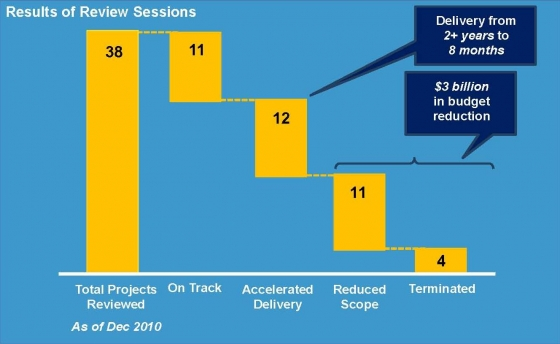

==== Suspension ====
On March 13, 2009, Kundra was placed on indefinite leave following an FBI raid on his former D.C. office and the arrest of two individuals in relation to a bribery investigation. Kundra returned to duties after five days with no finding of wrongdoing on his part.

=== Post-Obama administration career ===
Kundra left his post as chief information officer in August 2011 to accept an academic fellowship at Harvard University, conducting research at both the Berkman Center for Internet & Society and the Joan Shorenstein Center on the Press, Politics and Public Policy.

In January 2012 Kundra joined Salesforce.com as Executive Vice President of Emerging Markets. In February, 2017 he joined Outcome Health as EVP of Provider Solutions, and then promoted to Chief Operating Officer in July. Vivek left Outcome in Nov 2017 soon after its major investors filed a lawsuit alleging improper practices against its founders for misleading advertisers and investors. On May 16, 2018 Kundra joined the private start-up Sprinklr as chief operating officer.

== Professional recognition ==
In May 2011, Kundra was selected by EMC Corporation for their Data Hero Visionary Award for his pioneering work under the Obama administration to reform how the federal government manages and uses information technology. EMC states that, "Kundra has led the nation to seek innovative solutions to lower the cost of government operations, while exploring ways to fundamentally change the way the public sector and the public interact".

In March 2011, Kundra was selected by the World Economic Forum as a Young Global Leader for his professional accomplishments, commitment to society and potential to contribute to shaping the future of the world.

Kundra was awarded the 2010 National Cyber Security Leadership Award by the SANS Institute for uncovering more than $300 million each year in wasted federal spending on ineffective certification and accreditation reporting and demonstrating an alternative approach called "continuous monitoring" that provides more effective security for federal systems at lower costs.

Kundra was named Chief of the Year on December 21, 2009, by InformationWeek for driving unprecedented change in federal IT.

Kundra was named by InfoWorld among the top 25 CTO's in the country.

He was also selected as a 2008 MIT Sloan CIO Symposium Award Finalist on 'Balancing Innovation and Cost Leadership'. Both organizations cited the "stock market" approach to IT portfolio management that Kundra implemented for the District of Columbia. The system measured project performance and allocated IT investments similar to the way the public companies trade on the stock market.

Harvard Kennedy School of Government's Ash Institute also awarded the Innovations in American Government Award (2009) to "District of Columbia's Data Feeds: Democratization of Government Data". The project spearheaded by Kundra, Mayor Fenty, and CPO David Gragan was cited for "increase in civic participation, government accountability, and transparency in D.C. government practices" through sites like the Digital Public Square and the DC Data Catalog.

Kundra was recognized as the 2008 Government Sector IT Executive of the Year by the Tech Council of Maryland. The organization cited Kundra's efforts to increase public access to government information and services through live data feeds and data sets. Kundra was also a recipient of the Federal 100 Award for significant contributions to the federal information technology community.

== See also ==
- Government 2.0
