= Wearable =

Wearable may refer to:

- Clothing
- Wearable technology
  - Wearable computer
    - Activity tracker
