= Web operations =

Management of web-based applications and systems

Web operations (WebOps) is a domain of expertise within IT systems management that involves the deployment, operation, maintenance, tuning, and repair of web-based applications and systems. WebOps is also increasingly acknowledged as crucial to the success of digital marketing teams, and shows up as part of the MarTech (marketing technology) ecosystem.

== Overview ==
Historically, operations were seen as a late phase of the Waterfall model development process. After engineering had built a software product, and QA had verified it as correct, it would be handed to a support staff to operate the working software. Such a view assumed that software was mostly immutable in production and that usage would be mostly stable. Increasingly, "a web application involves many specialists, but it takes people in web ops to ensure that everything works together throughout an application's lifetime". The role is gaining respect as a distinct specialty among developers and managers, and is considered by many to be a subset of the larger DevOps movement.

With the rise of web technologies since mid-1995, specialists have emerged that understand the complexities of running a web application. Earlier examples of IT operations teams exist, such as the Network Operations Center (NOC) and the Database Administration (DBA) function.

== WebOps vs DevOps ==
Web applications are unique in many ways, presenting challenges that other software types do not have to deal with:

- Their use by a distributed, often uncontrolled, user base.
- The many independent networks between end users and the data center from which content is served.
- The way in which web pages are delivered as atomic transactions, requiring additional technologies (such as HTTP cookies) to associate sequences of pages into a user interaction.
- The three-tiered model of web, application, and database components (such as LAMP environments consisting of Linux, Apache, MySQL and either Perl or PHP).
- The requirement that you must often import the application's database and uploaded files (including potentially sensitive user data) to properly develop or test the application (such as when building a content management system, or using a CMS framework such as Drupal, Wordpress, or web frameworks like Django).
- WebOps includes front-end developers as key stakeholders

In this sense, WebOps simply refers to DevOps for web applications.

== Responsibilities ==
Web operations teams are tasked with a variety of responsibilities, including:

- The deployment of web applications
- The monitoring, error isolation, escalation, and repair of problems
- Performing performance management, availability reporting, and other administration
- Configuring load-balancing and working with content delivery networks to improve the reliability and reduce the latency of the system
- Measuring the impact of changes to content, applications, networks, and infrastructure

Typically, web operations personnel are familiar with the TCP/IP stack, the http protocol, HTML page markup, and Rich Internet applications (RIAs) such as AJAX and the like.

== See also ==
- Webreep model
