= Turbomilk =

- Website type: Icon and GUI design service
- Owners: Yegor Gilyov, Denis Kortunov, Dmitry Joukov
- Website: http://www.turbomilk.com/
- Commercial: Graphic Design Service
- Launched: April 2002

Turbomilk — Russian graphic design company founded in Samara on December 1, 2002. Turbomilk is engaged in graphic design and user interface design. The founders of the company are freelance designers who decided on combining their creative efforts using the co-working model. Originally, the company became well-known as the name behind the blog about icons, user interface design and project management compiled by the employees of the company. Since 2008, Turbomilk is the organizer of 404fest — the conference of web developers from Russia and CIS countries.

== Important events ==
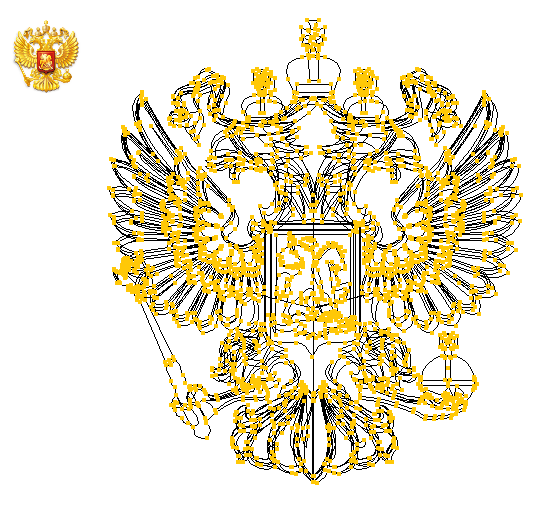
@KremlinRussia userpic — The official Twitter of the President of Russia (source vector file)

- In 2004 Yegor Gilyov, a Turbomilk employee became the first Russian to ever win Pixelpalooza the annual World competition of icon designers organized by The Iconfactory.
- The article from our blog “10 mistakes in icon design” about bad practices in icon making gained the World fame and was translated into several languages by graphics enthusiasts.
- The studio suggested its own mascot for the Winter Olympics in Sochi of 2014 — the Happy Mittens, which ranked as a solid runner-up after Zoich in the public voting on the Internet.
- The official Twitter of the President of Russia features the userpic of coat of arms of the Russian Federation which was exclusively made by Turbomilk in accordance with the icon design rules (for lines to match the pixels).
- In May 2009 Turbomilk launched its own non-profit project Iconza. This web service is a repository of royalty-free icons with functionality to change color and size of selected icons.

== Work ==
Most famous projects of Turbomilk include:

=== GUI design ===
- 1C:Enterprise platform user interface

=== Icon design ===
- Icons and illustrations for QuestBack website and web app
- Icons for Begun context ad system
- New icons for mIRC Internet Relay Chat client
- Harbahabr social network icons
- Icons of cars and virtual garages for Avtocadabra social network
- Original icons with a special manual for Intuit
- Icon for LiveJournal mobile app

=== Logo design ===
- Kanobu gaming portal logo
- MSDN TV channel logo
