= Xiaomi Mi Smart Band 6 =

Wearable activity tracker

Mi Smart Band 6
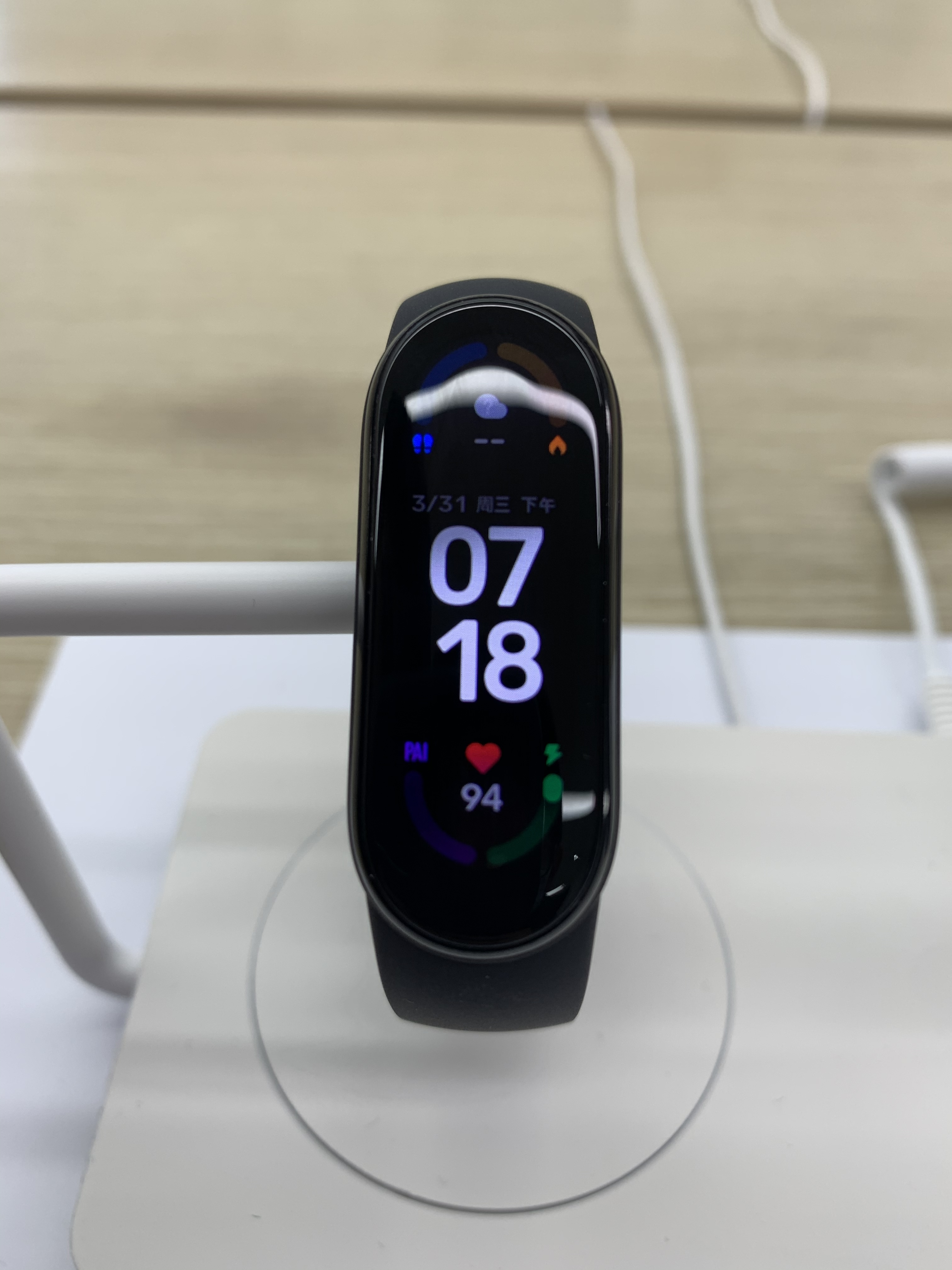
- Developer: Xiaomi
- Manufacturer: Anhui Huami Information Technology Co. Ltd
- Product family: Mi Band
- Type: Activity tracker, watch
- Generation: 6
- Released: 29 March 2021
- Operating system: MIUI Band OS 10
- Display: 1.56 inch AMOLED, 152 x 486 pixels, 326 ppi, Up to 450 nits brightness
- Connectivity: Bluetooth 5.0 BLE; NFC in some models.
- Power: 125 mAh
- Dimensions: 47.4 x 18.6 x 12.7mm
- Weight: 12.8 g
- Predecessor: Xiaomi Mi Smart Band 5
- Successor: Xiaomi Smart Band 7
- Website: www.mi.com/global/product/mi-smart-band-6

The Xiaomi Mi Smart Band 6 is a wearable activity tracker produced by Xiaomi Inc. It was announced in China on 29 March 2021, and was available starting 2 April 2021 in China. It has a 1.56-inch, 152 x 486 pixels resolution capacitive AMOLED display and 24/7 heart rate monitor and a SpO2 sensor. It also comes with a NFC variant. Mi Smart Band 6 allows for the unlocking of Windows laptops through Windows Hello.

== See also ==
- Xiaomi
- Mi Smart Band 5
- Mi Smart Band 7
- Xiaomi Mi Smart Band
