= Customer feedback management services =

Customer feedback management (CFM) online services are web applications that allow businesses to manage user suggestions and complaints in a structured fashion. A 2011 study conducted by Aberdeen Group showed that companies using customer feedback management services and social media monitoring have a 15% better customer retention rate.

== Methodology ==
Various online CFM services use different approaches. Most methodologies aim to measure customer satisfaction, with some models also measuring related constructs including customer loyalty and customer word-of-mouth (see Webreep model). The methodology behind each service has an essential impact on the nature of the service itself and is the main differentiator between them. The primary feedback management methodologies are listed below.

=== Feedback analytics ===
Feedback analytics services use customer-generated feedback data to measure customer experience and improve customer satisfaction. Feedback data is collected, then, using key performance indicators and feedback metrics, turned into actionable information for website improvement. Feedback analytics services provide website owners with the ability to create feedback forms that can be customized to fit the website and placed on all pages. This allows the website's users to submit feedback when they encounter a problem or have a feature request. A feedback button is visible at all times on each of the site's pages. Feedback analytics provide page- and website-level actionable data, enabling a website owner to read and manage feedback and get back to users. The feedback is accessible only to the website owner. This means that websites using feedback analytics are not exposed to the potential harm to their brand that public feedback may cause. Feedback collection can be passive (using a feedback button), or active (using a feedback form that appears under certain conditions), or both. The ability to choose the location of the button, as well as the frequency and conditions of the pop-up make feedback analytics a relatively non-intrusive approach from the point of view of the website user. Due to its measurable nature, feedback analytics data can be integrated with web analytics data, allowing website owners to understand what their users are doing on their site (using web analytics) and why they do it (using feedback analytics), in one single interface.

=== Customer feedback optimization ===
Also referred to as review forum optimization or RFO. Similar to SEO, CFO is the process of affecting the visibility of select web pages or results in the natural or unpaid results of various customer feedback management services or online review forums. CFO stands for customer feedback optimization, thus the sites being optimized are those for the review, ranking, and giving feedback of goods and or services by customers. In recent years review forums or customer feedback management services have been growing rapidly in influence, with 83% of consumers saying online reviews influence their perception of a company. In addition, a study states that, consumers were willing to pay between 20 percent and 99 percent more for an Excellent (5 star) rating than for a Good (4 star rating), depending on the product category. Some commonly known review forums are Yelp (20 million visits in February 2013), Trip Advisor (10 million visits in February 2013), Travelocity (3.7 million visits in February 2013), and Angie's List (3.4 million visits in February 2013).

== Feature comparison ==
Below is a comparison of notable customer feedback management services.

Legend:

- Who voted: displays the users who voted on an item, but not each user's vote
- Human friendly URLs: /product/Suggestion_name. Human-unfriendly URLs: /akira/dtd/6320-2416, /pages/general/suggestions/7841
- Merge suggestions: more than deleting duplicate suggestions, merging adds votes from the merged suggestion into the main one
- Custom URL: DNS aliasing a subdomain like feedback.mycompany.com to the subdomain of the online feedback service (e.g. mycompany.cfmsite.com)

Name	Voting	Who voted	Categories	Tags	Human-friendly URLs	Custom layout	Merge suggestions	Moderation	Integration	Single sign-on	Custom URL	API	Feedback privacy	Alexa traffic rank
Get Satisfaction	+1 with total and "best points" voting for specific replies	Yes	No	Yes	Yes	Yes with Enterprise option	Yes	Yes	Salesforce, Facebook, Zendesk, Pivotal Tracker, Parature, Google*Apps, Twitter, e-mail notifications, site widgets, open API for custom integration	Yes with Connect	Yes with any paid plan		yes with private feedback option or login-required community	2,066
IdeaScale	thumbs up/down with breakdown	Yes	custom-defined	Yes	Yes	Yes	Yes	paid plans only	e-mail updates, facebook, Twitter, RSS feeds (new topics, new comments), Widgets	Yes	paid plans only	paid plans only		62,680^{2012-Feb}
UserVoice	Yes, but only vote "for" ideas	Yes + ability to export user data	Yes	No	Yes	Branding and white label available	Yes - Currently in Beta	Yes	e-mail updates, API, feedback widget, RSS feed	Yes w/ paid edition :: otherwise OpenID, GoogleID, Yahoo, AOL, Facebook, MySpace	Yes, domain aliasing	Yes, there's a public API coming and an enterprise edition	Yes - Invitation only, Single Sign-On or filtered by email domain	5,144

== See also ==
- Customer experience
- Enterprise feedback management
