= Medallia =

American customer and employee experience management company

Medallia, Inc.
- Type: Private
- Industry: Customer experience
- Founded: 2001; 25 years ago
- Founders: Borge Hald; Amy Pressman
- Headquarters: Tysons, Virginia, U.S.
- Key people: Mark Bishof (Chairman, CEO); Sid Banerjee (Chief Strategy Officer)Bas Brukx (Chief Financial Officer); Ram Ramachandran (Chief Transformation Officer); Fabrice Martin (Chief Product Officer); Carrie Parker (Chief Marketing Officer)
- Products: Medallia Experience Cloud; Customer Experience; Employee Experience; Product Experience; B2B Experience
- Revenue: ▲US$477 million (2020)
- Net income: ▼US$−149 million (2020)
- Owner: Investor Group led by Blackstone
- Number of employees: 2,037 (January 2021)
- Website: medallia.com

Medallia is an American customer and employee experience management company based in Tysons, Virginia. It provides software-as-a-service customer experience management software to hospitality, retail, financial services, high-tech, and business-to-business companies internationally.

== Overview ==
As part of a customer experience management (CX) program, Medallia's cloud-based platform captures voice of the customer feedback across Web, social, text, video, speech, messaging, and contact center channels. It applies artificial intelligence and machine learning to detect patterns, uncover issues, and predict customer behavior across channels. Data is analyzed in real-time, and action workflows are provided to executive, central and front-line teams for customer satisfaction, customer loyalty, and overall business performance.

Medallia's platform also includes digital experience analytics, which capture unsolicited visitor behavior signals from websites and mobile apps, such as session replays, heatmaps, and customer journey paths. These digital behavioral insights can be viewed alongside solicited survey feedback, giving teams a combined view of what customers do and what they say. Additional capabilities include survey creation and management, text analytics and dashboarding, and direct goals and action management.

In the mid-2020s, the company focused its product development around delivering employee-facing AI-generated insights and recommended actions.

== History ==
=== Founding and early growth ===
Medallia was founded in 2001 by Borge Hald and Amy Pressman, who previously worked as consumer-company relationship consultants for Fortune 500 executives. Several years after its founding, the company began expanding through acquisitions. In October 2016, Medallia acquired Kampyle, and in 2019, Medallia acquired CoolaData.

=== IPO, acquisitions, and Thoma Bravo purchase ===
In July 2019, Medallia went public on the NYSE under the ticker symbol MDLA. At the time, the company was led by CEO Leslie James Stretch.

Following its IPO, Medallia continued to grow through acquisitions. In April 2020, the company acquired voice-to-text specialist Voci Technologies for $59 million. In September 2020, it acquired Stella Connect, a New York–based real-time feedback, coaching, and quality management platform for customer service teams, for approximately $100 million. Another acquisition followed in March 2021 with the purchase of Decibel, a London-based digital experience analytics provider, for approximately $160 million, adding session replay, heatmaps, and behavioral scoring to its platform.

In October 2021, Thoma Bravo, a private equity firm specializing in software and technology, acquired Medallia in an all cash transaction valued at $6.4 billion. Less than a year later, in August 2022, Medallia acquired Mindful (formerly VHT), a cloud-based contact center callback technology provider, from private equity firm Alpine Investors.

=== Leadership and product changes ===
In early 2025, Medallia underwent several leadership and product changes. The company appointed Mark Bishof, former CEO of Clarabridge and former chief business officer at Qualtrics, as chairman and chief executive officer in January. The following month, Fabrice Martin was named chief product officer, and in March, Carrie Parker was named chief marketing officer.

In March 2025, the company updated its products with seven new AI capabilities, including Intelligent Summaries, Smart Response, Root Cause Assist, and Themes with Generative AI. These became part of the company’s Frontline-Ready AI^{TM} suite. Medallia announced additional AI releases in February 2026, including its Smart Topic Builder and Insights Assistant.

=== Debt restructuring and ownership transition ===
In June 2026, Medallia announced a recapitalization agreement with its primary lenders to restructure its existing debt. The agreement was finalized in August 2026. Under the terms of the agreement, ownership of the company transitioned from Thoma Bravo to an investor group led by Blackstone, Apollo and FS KKR Capital Corp. The transaction significantly reduced Medallia’s outstanding debt and provided $150 million in new capital. Medallia intended to use the funding to accelerate AI-driven innovation.

== See also ==
- Customer experience (CX)
- Customer feedback management services
