= Enterprise feedback management =

Enterprise feedback management (EFM) is a system of processes and software that enables organizations to centrally manage deployment of surveys while dispersing authoring and analysis throughout an organization. EFM systems typically provide different roles and permission levels for different types of users, such as novice survey authors, professional survey authors, survey reporters and translators. EFM can help an organization establish a dialogue with employees, partners, and customers regarding key issues and concerns and potentially make customer-specific real time interventions. EFM consists of data collection, analysis and reporting.

Modern EFM systems can track feedback from a variety of sources including customers, market research, social media, employees, vendors, partners and audits in a privatized or public manner.

EFM systems can be applied by companies operating in different fields: e.g., systems provided by Confirmit, CXGroup, InMoment, MaritzCX, Clarabridge, Medallia, NICE Systems, Netigate, Qualtrics, QuestBack, Verint, QuestionPro, Zoho Survey, Qwary are used by more than half of the Fortune 100 companies from business services, consumer goods, financial services, government and public services, healthcare, manufacturing, media and communication, non-profit and other associations, research and professional services, retail, technology, and travel, hospitality, and restaurants industries.

== Background ==
The term enterprise feedback management was coined by Perseus Development in 2004 and was first popularized in 2005 by Gartner. Their definition of it was "formal tools for data collection and output analysis".

Prior to EFM, survey software was typically deployed in departments and lacked user roles, permissions and workflow. EFM enables deployment across the enterprise, providing decision makers with important data for increasing customer satisfaction, loyalty and lifetime value. EFM enables companies to look at customers "holistically" and to better respond to customer needs.

Enterprise feedback management systems root from PA technologies. It is possible to infer about the PA that they represent a part of such a vast field of knowledge as data mining. The forecast of the current and future tendencies is based on the data already acquired. PA implies various types of modeling: clustering (cluster analysis), decision trees, regression analysis, artificial neural networks, text mining, hypothesis testing, etc. Predictive Analysis technologies are actually tools to transform data to information and then to knowledge. This transformation was partly described in the article As We May Think written by Vannevar Bush in 1945.

EFM applications support complex survey design, with features such as question and page rotation, quota management and skip patterns and branching. The software typically offers advanced reporting with statistical analysis and centralized panel management. EFM applications are often integrated with external platforms, most typically with customer relationship management (CRM) systems but also with HRIS systems and generic web portals.

Unlike low-end survey tools, EFM applications provides a workflow process with user roles and permissions, so that users may be able to author a survey but require another user to approve it before it is published. Such workflow ensures consistent survey quality and enforces respondent privacy and IT security policies. Applications of EFM vary widely from HR, IT, Marketing, Sales and continues to expand on its corporate implementation and scope. Departments within an organization can collaborate on feedback initiatives, sharing results and gaining insights that enable the organization to listen, learn and react to the needs of their stakeholders. A key part of the value of an EFM deployment is the development of the business rules (i.e. who needs to see what feedback info) and which parts of the customer/employee/partner facing process needs to be measured.

== EFM today: current situation and emerging tendencies ==
Gartner projected that 40 percent of total feedback system deployments would be EFM solutions in 2008. It is worth noting that the motivation to pilot/deploy EFM is often to reduce the reliance on (or reduce the costs of) traditional satisfaction research.

Esteban Kolsky, when a research director at Gartner, described the market structure as follows: "The market for these tools is a highly fragmented one, with no single provider. It's going to jumpstart a bunch of acquisitions as larger vendors look to work EFM and surveying into their growth strategy." Since then, technology companies such as Medallia and Satmetrix have received significant backing from venture capital investors.

The EFM market grew 60% to 70% in 2005 and 2006.

Here are some of the ways in which EFM has been evolving:

- From Multi-Channel Customer Surveys to Multi-Channel Customer Feedback

In recent years, EFM solution providers have focused on rounding out their capabilities to conduct surveys across multiple deployment modes: email, website, phone, IVR, SMS, paper, fax, kiosk. The next generation of EFM solutions also enable companies to capture feedback from critical new sources including social media, online communities, call recordings, contact center notes, and more, to get a true “360-degree view” of the customer. The ability to monitor feedback via social media has become increasingly important, as ever-growing numbers of customers are sharing their views via blogs, Facebook, Twitter, news sites, forums, review sites, and video sites. With the help of responsive touch point tracker software, it is also possible to receives reliable feedback directly at points of sale. As a result of mobile-friendliness the feedback can submitted through both tablets and smartphones.

- From Siloed Insights to Integrated Insights

Capturing feedback is only the first step. Next generation EFM solutions also have the ability to generate unique insights by integrating and analyzing multi-channel feedback. For example, users can compare sentiment in social media data side-by-side with survey satisfaction and loyalty scores, and drill deeper than ever into feedback sources at the response level (verbatim survey responses, call recordings, etc.) for greater context. These insights enable companies to more easily identify the root causes of problems, determine the most appropriate actions, and target investments to deliver the most impact on the bottom line.

- From Simple Survey Alerts to Advanced Case Management Across Feedback Channels

The next generation of EFM solutions goes far beyond basic alerts triggered by negative survey responses. Comprehensive EFM systems now offer full case management to respond efficiently to individual customers’ problems and comprehensive case analytics across feedback channels. This enables organizations to respond to individual customers in a highly efficient manner that optimizes the use of scarce front-line and executive resources.

- From Static Insights Seen by Few to Real-time Insights Accessible by All

In order to transform customer feedback into a strategic tool for driving competitive advantage, that data needs to be readily on-hand at the point of daily decision making. The next generation of EFM solutions automatically delivers the most relevant real-time feedback data to each user across the enterprise, according to his or her role – executive, manager, customer service agent, etc. – without creating undue burden for program administrators. For example, American General Life uses action management capabilities to address service and quality issues throughout the organization in real-time, with survey responses triggering email alerts and case management tools according to business rules. Action alerts allow the company to be more proactive and more quickly address issues with customers – and because they track issues at touch point levels, customer survey scores show directly how changes impact the customer experience.

With the information from their customer feedback program, American General Life has identified opportunities to reduce technology costs, avoid expenses, and optimize business processes. They track scores and trends to understand how each business area can enhance the customer experience. As a result, they have been able to increase overall customer satisfaction and positively impact customer retention.

One of the important trends of EFM development today is its producers going mobile. For example, Verint Technologies has introduced EFM mobile app. The possibility to manage feedback using portable devices has a lot of significant advantages which will provide the company`s employees with ability of collecting and analysing data conveniently and in time. The most important innovations are:

- Optimizing Surveys for mobile devices. With these new technologies it is possible now to work with EFM on tablets and smartphones;
- Using Mobile Reporting. Necessary analysis can be carried out and managerial decisions can be taken within specific time constraints;
- Taking Advantage of Mobile Offline Surveys. While previous EFM versions have to be connected to the Internet, this mobile service lets the researcher perform the analysis partly offline and then sync the data with the Web app.
- Increasing Response Rates with SMS. Researchers can reach their customers with SMS, bulk messages, and reminders.

== Criticism ==
Though EFM may seem a good tool for various data analysis, it has been suggested that "EFM is a description of the past". The main disadvantages of EFM could be that it focuses on the enterprise, not the customer; insight across a variety of inputs should be examined, feedback would be too narrow field here; the value of the system should derive from taking actions, not just managing surveys. The author of the article Enterprise Feedback Management (EFM) Is Dead implies that "Customer Insight and Action Platforms" (CIA) should be used instead of EFM.

== See also ==
- B2B Marketing
- Business intelligence
- Business-to-business
- Customer data management
- Customer engagement
- Customer feedback management services
- Customer Intelligence
- Customer relationship management
- Customer satisfaction
