= Consumer information =

Consumer information may refer to:

- Mandatory labelling, product information for consumers
- Customer data, information collected about the consumer during the buying process for the purpose of customer intelligence, market research, etc.
