= Apps.gov =

Apps.gov was a cloud storefront run by the U.S. General Services Administration to assist federal agencies in purchasing cloud computing services from the marketplace. The website was initially launched in 2009 under the direction of former Federal Chief Information Officer Vivek Kundra, but was first closed down in 2012 in order to "streamline" procurement and amid reports of low usage. The service was relaunched at the 2016 SXSW festival by a team of Presidential Innovation Fellows following President Obama's keynote address on using technology to improve government. The site has not been available since early 2019, though no official shutdown was ever announced.

== History ==
Apps.gov was initially launched in September 2009 by the Obama administration as part of a larger effort to change the way the federal government used and procured technology. It was pushed by the first U.S. Chief Information Officer Vivek Kundra, who also worked on releasing Data.gov to make government data available to the public and the Federal IT Dashboard to judge the worthiness of technology programs. The idea behind Apps.gov was to encourage and make it easier for federal agencies to adopt cloud software that could increase cost-effectiveness and IT infrastructure sustainability.

In fiscal year 2011, the GSA reported that the platform offered more than 3,000 cloud-based products and services and that the site received roughly 3,800 visits per month. The report also stated that agencies had purchased over $5 million in products from the platform.

Despite this, the program faced criticism for not serving a clear purpose, since there were already websites available for purchasing less expensive cloud products and larger deals required additional layers of approval that could not be handled in a simple web app. Certain acquisition regulations meant that buying a product through Apps.gov was not possible. According to those who relaunched the program in 2016, the old website had a number of problems, such as an inconsistent process of approving and accrediting products, an overlapping mission with other acquisition programs and a closed platform. The platform was closed on December 1, 2012, with a statement from the GSA saying it was part of "an effort to provide streamlined customer service."

Apps.gov was relaunched at the 2016 South by Southwest festival in Austin, Texas, following a keynote address by President Obama about the importance of technology in good government. The reboot was carried out by the Presidential Innovation Fellows, a program that seeks to bring technologists and entrepreneurs into the government. According to those working on the project, the new site will be significantly better than the previous version. It will increase transparency in the acquisitions process, will be fully open-source, will be built with agile development allowing faster improvements and will take advantage of the proliferation of Software-as-a-service (SaaS) providers.
