= Xiaomi Mi Band 3 =

Wearable activity tracker

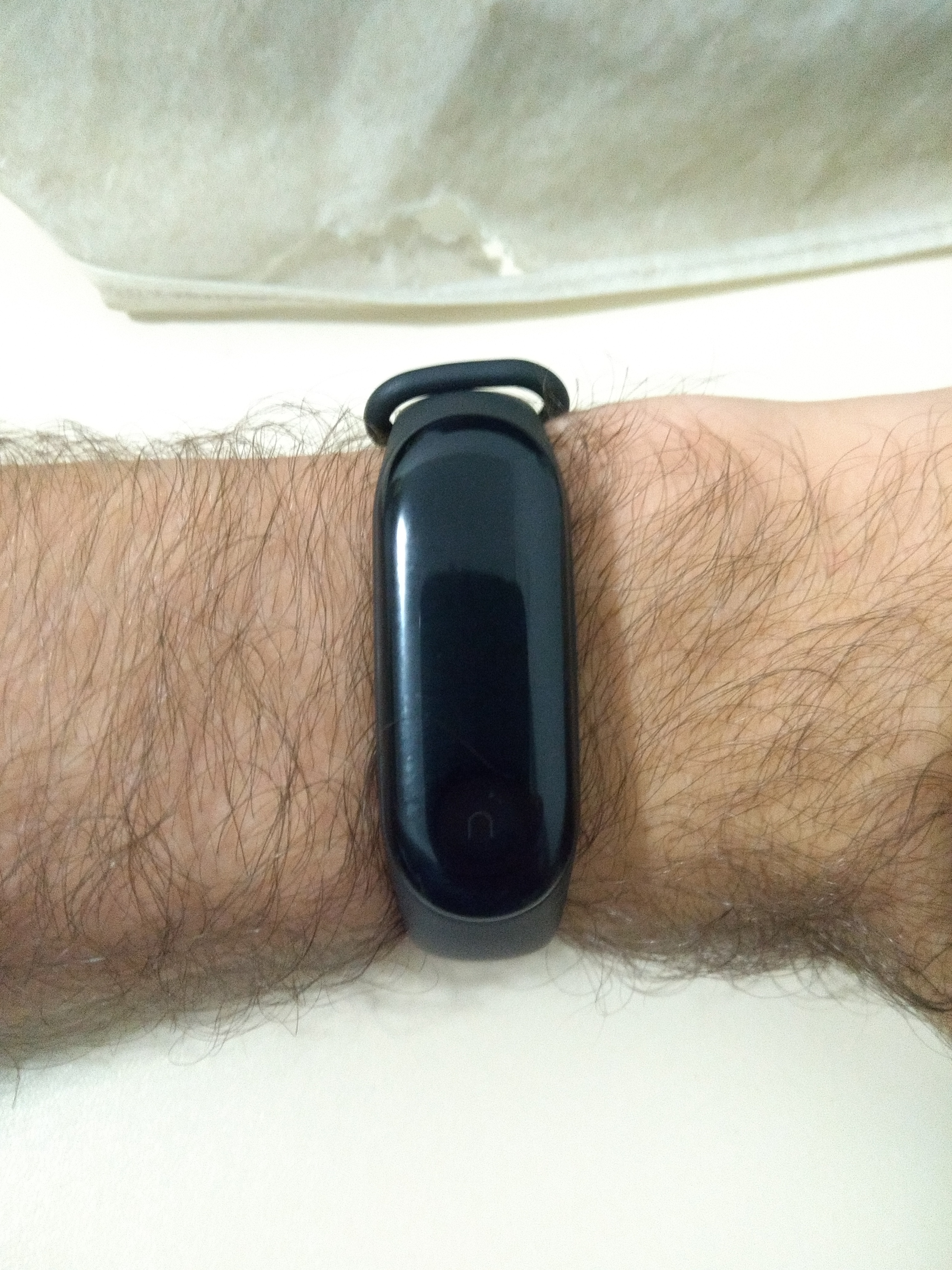
- Developer: Xiaomi
- Manufacturer: Anhui Huami Information Technology Co. Ltd
- Product family: Mi Band
- Type: Activity tracker
- Generation: 3
- Released: May 31, 2018
- Introductory price: 30€ in Amazon.es
- System on a chip: Dialog 14681
- Display: 0.78 inch OLED
- Connectivity: Bluetooth 4.2 BLE; NFC in some models.
- Power: 110 mAh
- Dimensions: 17.9 × 46.9 × 12mm
- Weight: 20 g
- Predecessor: Xiaomi Mi Band 2
- Successor: Xiaomi Mi Smart Band 4
- Website: Official website

The Xiaomi Mi Band 3 is a wearable activity tracker produced by Xiaomi Inc. It was released on 31 May 2018. It has a capacitive OLED display. The tracker features heart rate monitoring, although it does not offer continuous heart rate display.

== Specifications ==
- Display: 0.78 inch OLED, single point touch screen;
- Resolution: 128 × 80 pixels;
- Button: capacitive;
- Connectivity: Bluetooth version 4.2 BLE; NFC on some models;
- Size: 46.9 × 17.9 × 12 mm;
- Weight: 20 g;
- Casing: plastic + alloy;
- Battery capacity: 110 mAh for 20 days of battery life;
- Sensors: accelerometer, optical heart rate monitor;
- Waterproof: up to 50 metres, 5 atmospheres
