= Xiaomi Smart Band 10 =

Wearable activity tracker

Xiaomi Smart Band 10 Xiaomi Smart Band 10 Pro
- Developer: Xiaomi
- Manufacturer: Xiaomi
- Product family: Xiaomi Smart Band; Redmi Smart Band
- Type: Activity tracker, Watch
- Generation: Xiaomi Smart Band 10 / Pro: 9
- Released: Xiaomi Smart Band 10: 27 June 2025; Xiaomi Smart Band 10 Pro: 21 May 2026
- Connectivity: Xiaomi Smart Band 10 / Pro: Bluetooth 5.4 BLE
- Weight: Xiaomi Smart Band 10: 15.95 g (0.563 oz); Xiaomi Smart Band 10 Pro: 21.6 g (0.76 oz)
- Predecessor: Xiaomi Smart Band 9 Xiaomi Smart Band 9 Pro
- Successor: Xiaomi Smart Band 11
- Website: Xiaomi Smart Band 10: www.mi.com/global/product/xiaomi-smart-band-10/ Xiaomi Smart Band 10 Pro: www.mi.com/global/product/xiaomi-smart-band-10-pro/

The Xiaomi Smart Band 10 Series is a line of wearable activity trackers developed by Xiaomi Inc. It includes two main variants: the standard Xiaomi Smart Band 10 and the feature-rich Xiaomi Smart Band 10 Pro, which includes GPS.
