= Xiaomi Mi Band 2 =

Wearable activity tracker

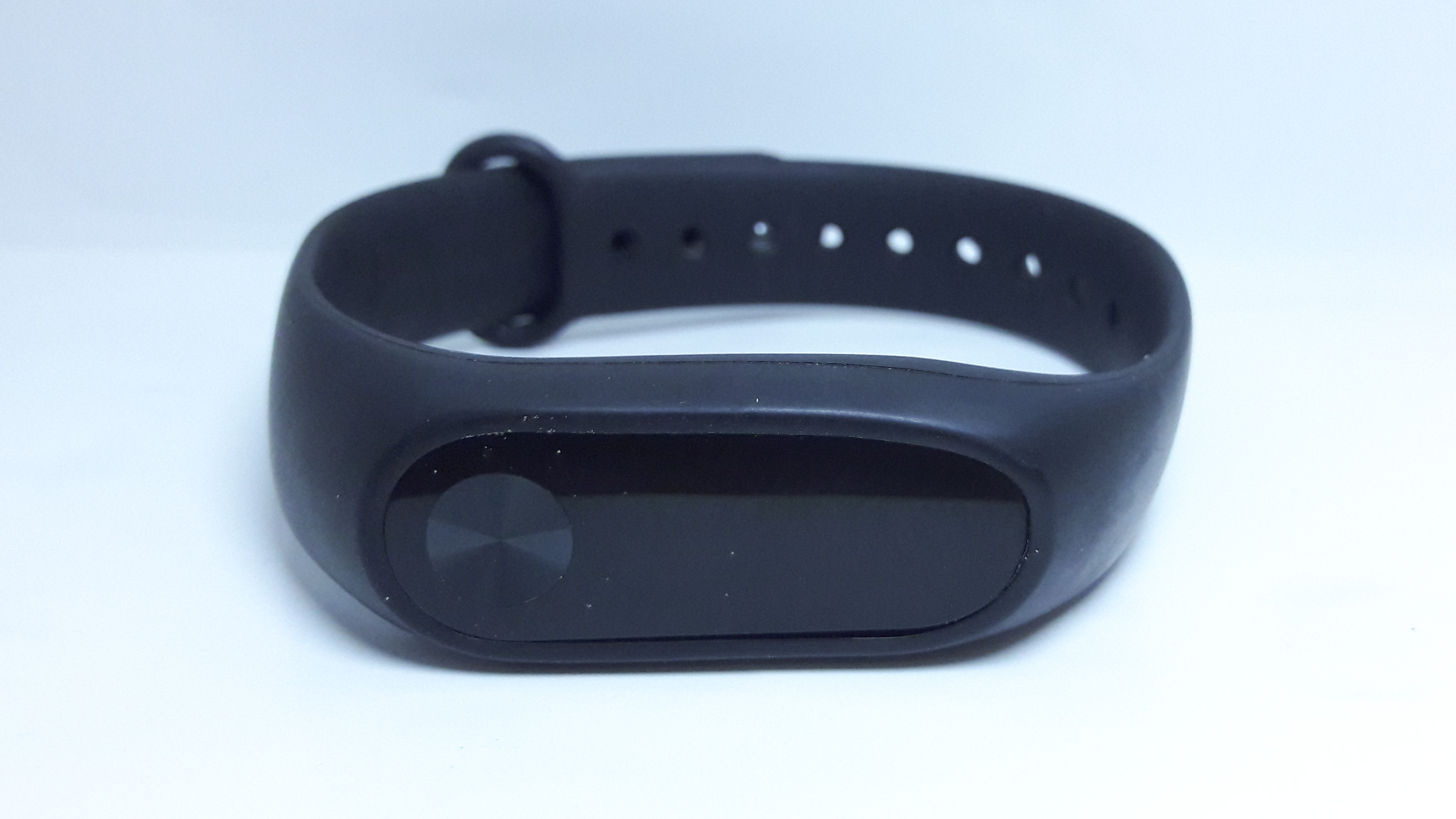
- Developer: Xiaomi
- Manufacturer: Foxconn; Anhui Huami Information Technology Co. Ltd
- Product family: Mi Band
- Type: Activity tracker
- Generation: 2
- Released: June 7, 2016
- System on a chip: Dialog DA14681 low-power Bluetooth chip
- Display: 0.42 inch OLED
- Graphics: Black and white
- Input: 45 mA (typ) 65 mA (max)
- Camera: No
- Connectivity: Bluetooth 4.0/4.2 BLE
- Power: 70 mAh
- Dimensions: 15.7×40.3×10.5mm
- Weight: 19 g
- Predecessor: Xiaomi Mi Band 1S; Xiaomi Mi Band
- Successor: Xiaomi Mi Band 3
- Website: www.mi.com/en/miband2/

The Xiaomi Mi Band 2 is a low cost, wearable activity tracker produced by Xiaomi. It was released on 7 June 2016. Unlike its predecessor, the Xiaomi Mi Band 2 comes with an OLED screen and a capacitive button. In September 2017, Xiaomi released an ultra low-cost version of the Mi Band 2, titled "Mi Band - HRX Edition"

On 31 May 2018, Xiaomi released the Mi Band 3, the successor to the Mi Band 2.

== Specifications ==
=== General ===
- Brand: Xiaomi
- Bluetooth version: V4.0 BLE (Chinese version), V4.2 BLE (International version)
- Waterproof Rating: IP67
- Color: Black
- Compatibility: Android 4.4 + / iOS 7.0 +
- Language: English / Chinese / Multilanguage
- Total length: 235 mm
- Adjustable length: 155–210 mm
- Product size (L x W x H): 40.3 x 15.7 x 10.5 mm
- Product weight: 7.0 g

=== Sensors ===
- Accelerometer
- Optical Heart Rate Monitor
- Vibration Engine

=== Display ===
- Display: 0.42 inch OLED
- Button: Capacitive

=== Battery ===
- Battery type: Lithium Polymer battery
- Battery capacity: 70 mAh
- Battery Life: 10–30 days
- Input current: 45 mA (TYP), 65 mA (MAX)
- Input voltage: DC 5V

=== Material ===
- Front Display Material: Makrolon polycarbonate
- Case material: TPSiV Thermoplastic copolyester
- Band material: Thermoplastic elastomer
- Band Clasp Material: Plastic
