= CoolaData =

Big data company

- Company type: Company
- Industry: Information technology, business intelligence
- Founded: 2012
- Founder: Tomer Ben Moshe, Guy Greenberg
- Headquarters: Tel Aviv, Israel and New York City, United States
- Number of locations: 2
- Services: Behavioral analytics, data warehousing
- Website: www.cooladata.com

CoolaData is a big data behavioral analytics platform for online web and mobile applications. It was acquired by Medallia in 2019.

Cooladata was founded with the vision of developing an advanced BI and analytics platform that would be able to store unlimited amounts of data events in the cloud, while providing advanced user behavioral analytics, or in other words, providing the analytical capabilities and agility of an enterprise, at a fraction of the cost.

== Founders ==
CoolaData was founded by two veteran BI experts. CoolaData's CEO Tomer Ben Moshe spent several years at Amdocs (NYSE:DOX), where he co-initiated and served as SVP, COO of Amdocs Cloud Services. Before Amdocs Tomer was the CTO of Microsoft Israel, where he worked closely with software vendors, startups and the developer community.

== Funding ==
The company is backed by 83North (formerly Greylock IL), Salesforce Ventures and Carmel Ventures.
