= Xiaomi Smart Band 9 =

Wearable activity tracker

Xiaomi Smart Band 9 Xiaomi Smart Band 9 Pro Xiaomi Smart Band 9 Active (Redmi Smart Band 3 in China)
- Developer: Xiaomi
- Manufacturer: Xiaomi
- Product family: Xiaomi Smart Band; Redmi Smart Band
- Type: Activity tracker, Watch
- Generation: Xiaomi Smart Band 9 / Pro / Active: 9 Redmi Smart Band 3: 3
- Released: Xiaomi Smart Band 9: 27 September 2024; Xiaomi Smart Band 9 Pro: 29 October 2024; Xiaomi Smart Band 9 Active: 18 November 2024; Redmi Smart Band 3: 29 October 2024
- Connectivity: Xiaomi Smart Band 9 / Pro: Bluetooth 5.4 BLE; Xiaomi Smart Band 9 Active / Redmi Smart Band 3: Bluetooth 5.3 BLE
- Weight: Xiaomi Smart Band 9: 15.8 g (0.56 oz); Xiaomi Smart Band 9 Pro: 24.5 g (0.86 oz); Xiaomi Smart Band 9 Active / Redmi Smart Band 3: 16.5 g (0.58 oz)
- Predecessor: Xiaomi Smart Band 8 Xiaomi Smart Band 8 Pro; Xiaomi Smart Band 8 Active / Redmi Smart Band 2
- Successor: Xiaomi Smart Band 10
- Website: Xiaomi Smart Band 9: www.mi.com/global/product/xiaomi-smart-band-9/ Xiaomi Smart Band 9 Pro: www.mi.com/global/product/xiaomi-smart-band-9-pro/ Xiaomi Smart Band 9 Active: www.mi.com/global/product/xiaomi-smart-band-9-active/

The Xiaomi Smart Band 9 Series is a line of wearable activity tracker developed by Xiaomi Inc. It includes three variants: the standard Xiaomi Smart Band 9, the feature-rich Xiaomi Smart Band 9 Pro, and the budget-friendly Xiaomi Smart Band 9 Active. In China, the Xiaomi Smart Band 9 Active was released as the Redmi Smart Band 3.

== Specifications ==
Model	Xiaomi Smart Band 9	Xiaomi Smart Band 9 Pro	Xiaomi Smart Band 9 Active (Redmi Smart Band 3 in China)
Colors	Midnight Black, Glacier Silver, Mystic Rose, Arctic Blue, Titan Gray, Graphite, Silver	Obsidian Black, Rose Gold, Moonlight Silver	Black, Beige White, Pink (Black, Beige in China)
Display	1.62" AMOLED touch display, always-on display, 60 Hz	1.74" AMOLED touch display, always-on display, 60 Hz	1.47" TFT display, 60 Hz
Brightness	Up to 1200 nits, adjustable	Maximum 1200 nits with auto brightness adjustment	Up to 450 nits, manually adjust
Resolution	192 x 490 pixels	336 x 480 pixels	172 x 320 pixels
Glass	Reinforced glass cover	2.5D reinforced glass	Reinforced glass cover
Chassis	N/A	Aluminum alloy frame and high-strength fiber polymer	N/A
Operating system	Hyper OS	Hyper OS	N/A
Size (excluding the health sensor)	46.53 x 21.63 x 10.95 mm	43.27 × 32.49 × 10.8 mm	45.9 x 26.94 x 9.99 mm
Weight (without strap)	15.8 g	24.5 g	16.5 g
Strap size	135–210 mm	135–205 mm	135–215 mm
Water resistance	5 standard atmospheres (510 kPa)		
Connectivity	Bluetooth 5.4	Bluetooth 5.4, A-GPS, GLONASS, Beidou, Galileo, QZSS	Bluetooth 5.3
Sensors	Accelerometer sensor; Gyroscope sensor; Optical heart rate sensor; Ambient light sensor	Accelerometer; Gyroscope; Electronic compass; Optical heart rate and pulse oximeter; Ambient light sensor	PPG sensor; Accelerometer; Motor: ERM
App. support	Mi Fitness		
Battery	233 mAh	350 mAh	300 mAh
