= Xiaomi Mi Smart Band 5 =

Smart activity tracker by Xiaomi

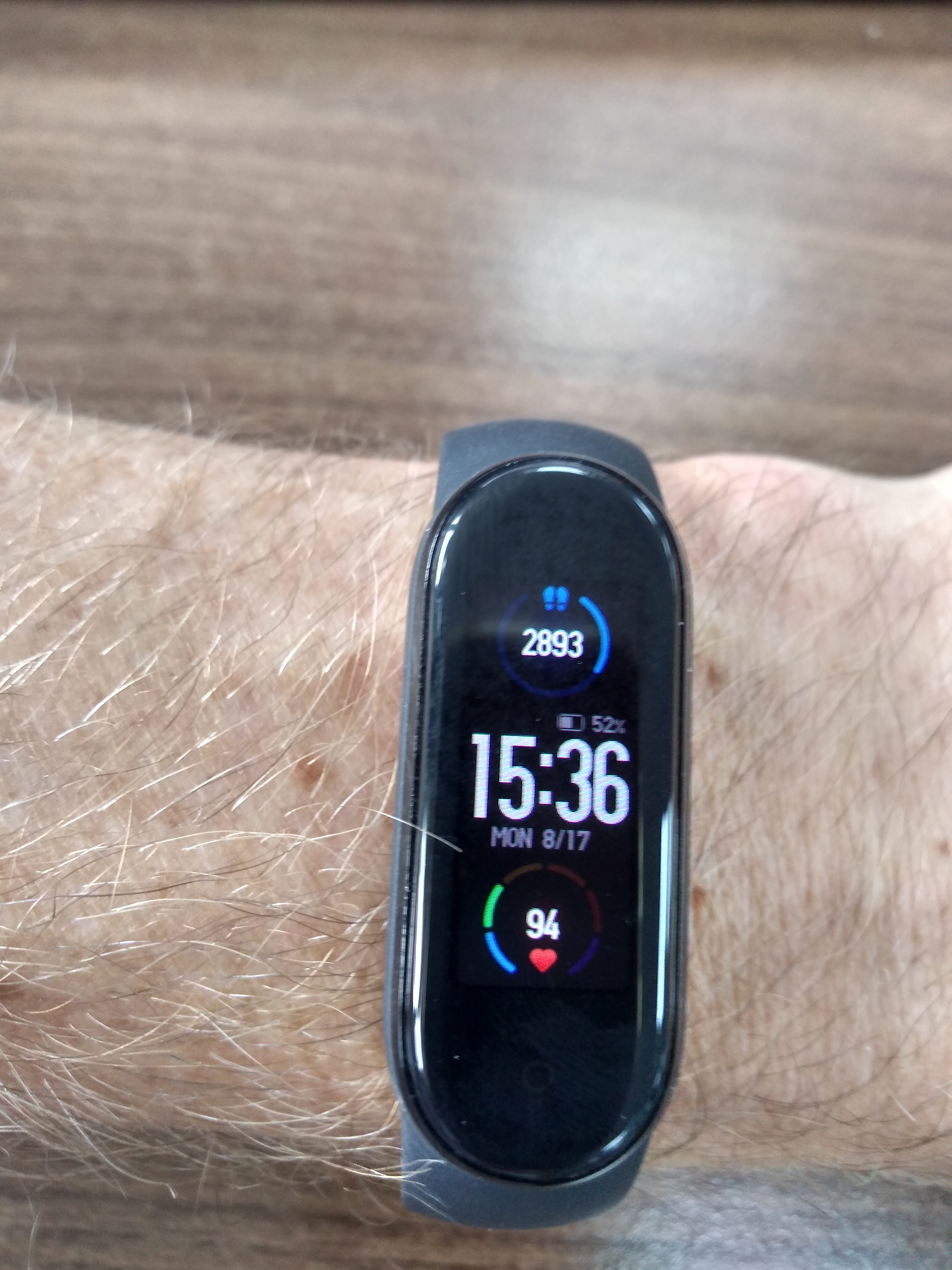
- Developer: Xiaomi
- Manufacturer: Anhui Huami Information Technology Co. Ltd
- Product family: Mi Band
- Type: Activity tracker, watch
- Generation: 5
- Released: 11 June 2020
- Introductory price: In China: US$26.68 non-NFC, $32.33 NFC.
- System on a chip: Dialog DA14697 SoC
- CPU: dialog DA14697
- Memory: 512KB
- Storage: 16MB
- Display: 1.1 inch AMOLED
- Connectivity: Bluetooth 5.0 BLE; NFC in some models.
- Power: 125 mAh
- Dimensions: 46.95 x 18.15 x 12.45 mm
- Weight: 11.9 g 12.1 g (NFC model)
- Predecessor: Xiaomi Mi Smart Band 4
- Successor: Xiaomi Mi Smart Band 6

The Xiaomi Mi Smart Band 5 (Xiaomi Mi Band 5 in China) is a wearable activity tracker produced by Xiaomi Inc. It was announced in China on 11 June 2020, and went on sale on 18 June 2020 in China, with a Global version released on 15 July 2020 as Xiaomi Mi Smart Band 5. It was released in India on 29 September 2020. It has a 1.1-inch, 126x294 resolution capacitive AMOLED display and 24/7 heart rate monitoring claiming a 50% more accurate PPG sensor than its predecessor. It supports a charging dock that locates using a magnet which is said to be easier to use than previous generation chargers. The NFC-enabled version also has an in-built microphone for Xiaomi's in-built assistant Xiao.

The Global Mi Smart Band does not have features such as Alexa Support, NFC and SpO2 tracking.

== Specifications ==
- Display: 1.1-inch (2.72cm) AMOLED, full color touch screen
- Dialog DA14697 (Arm Cortex M33)
- Colour depth: 16-bit
- Screen brightness: Up to 450 nits
- Resolution: 126x294
- Button: Single touch button (wake up, return)
- Connectivity: Bluetooth version 5.0 BLE, NFC on some models
- RAM: 512 KB
- Storage: 16 MB
- Battery: LiPo, 125 mAh, 14 days of battery life (NFC), 20 days (non-NFC)
- Sensors: accelerometer, gyroscope, PPG heart rate sensor, capacitive proximity sensor and infrared sensor (NFC Variant)
- Waterproof: up to 50 metres for 30 minutes, 5 atmospheres

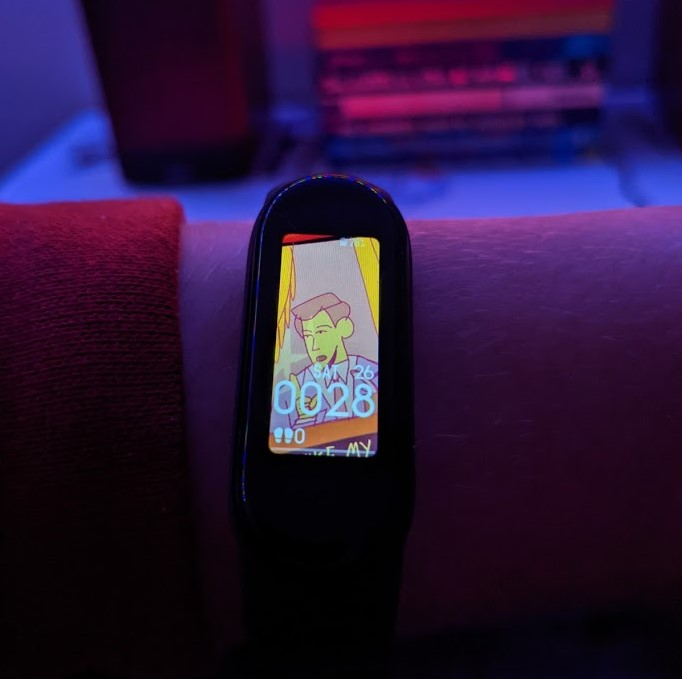
A picture of a Xiaomi Mi Smart Band 5 in a darkened room

== Functions ==
Heart rate monitor (24/7), Step counter, 11 workout modes (Outdoor running, Indoor running, Walking, Cycling, Indoor cycling, Pool swimming, Freestyle, Elliptical, jump rope, yoga, rowing machine), personal activity intelligence), camera controller, weather alerts, near-field communication (in some models), timer, stopwatch, rapid eye movement sleep + sleep monitor, women's health tracking, alarms, reminders, notifications, call mute and Call decline, Find phone, Silent phone, Brightness +/- and other minor features, Music controller, sedentary reminder, event reminder, breathing exercises, stress counter. Chinese version only: virtual assistant, microphone.

== See also ==
- Xiaomi
- Xiaomi Mi Band 4
- Xiaomi Mi Band 6
