= RS-Computer =

Puma shoe released in 1986

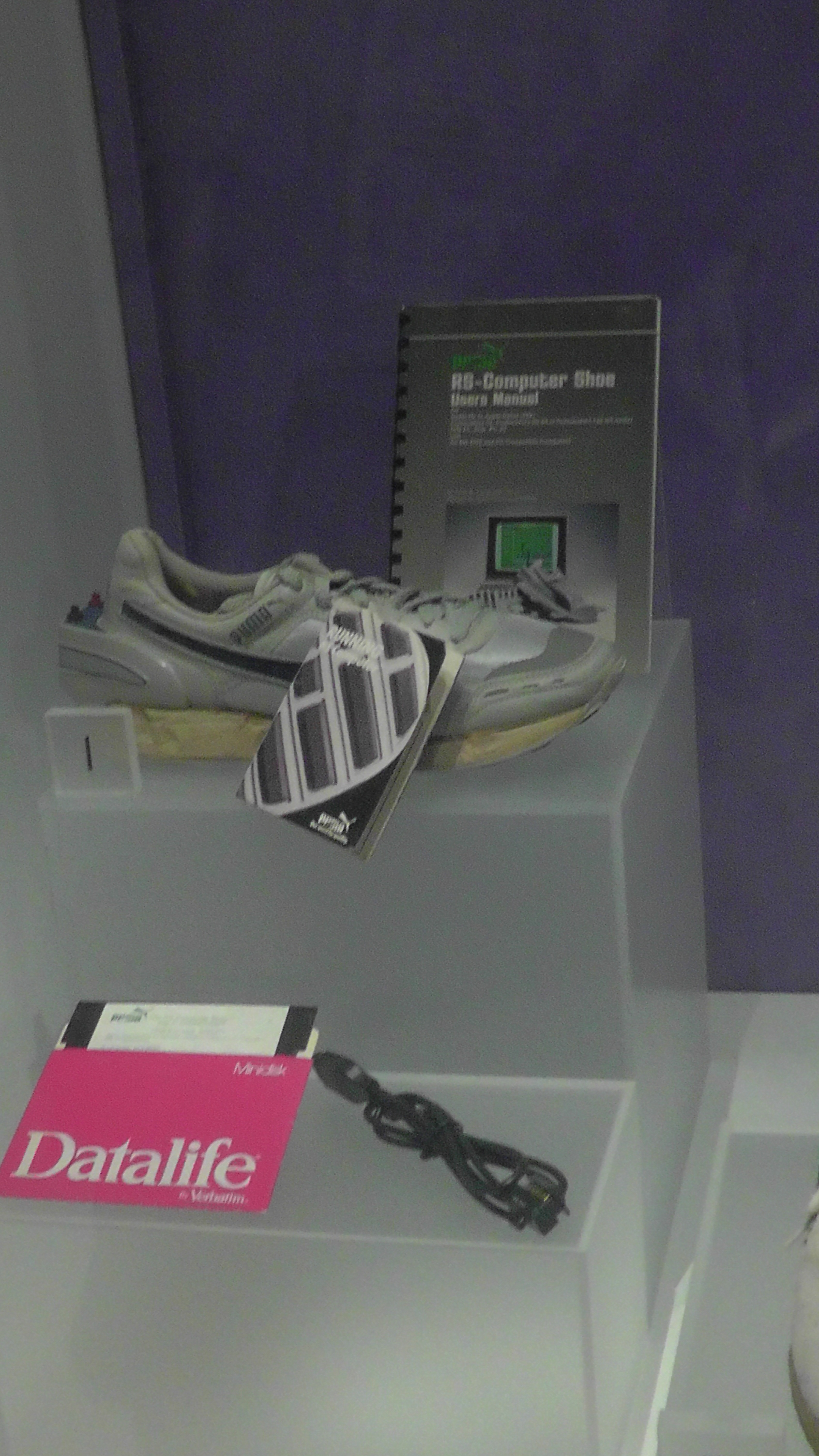
The RS-Computer on display at the Bata Shoe Museum

The RS-Computer, expanded as "Running System"-Computer Shoe, is a Puma shoe introduced in 1986 as an early proto-activity tracker by designer Peter Cavanaugh, and re-released as a smartphone-enabled device in 2018.
