= Xiaomi Smart Band 8 =

Wearable activity tracker

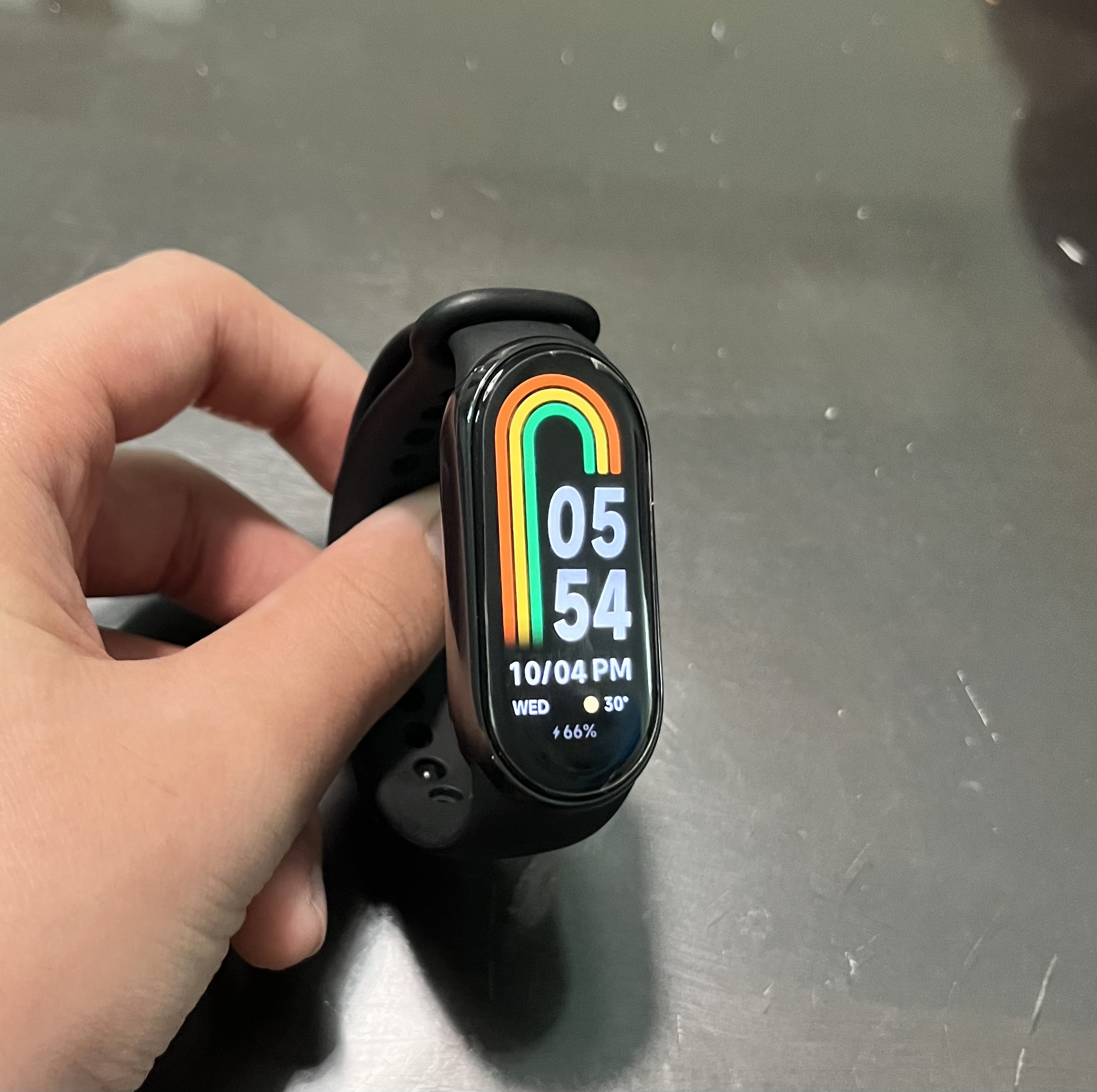
- Developer: Xiaomi
- Manufacturer: 70Mai Co. Ltd.
- Product family: Mi Band
- Type: Activity tracker, watch
- Generation: 8
- Released: In China: 18 April 2023; Globally: 26 October 2023
- Introductory price: US$33 non-NFC, $39 NFC.
- Operating system: FreeRTOS
- Display: 1.62-inch AMOLED, 490 x 192 pixels, 326 ppi, Up to 600 nits brightness, Always on Display
- Input: 5V (400 mA Max)
- Connectivity: Bluetooth 5.1 BLE; NFC in some models.
- Power: 190 mAh
- Dimensions: 48 x 22.5 x 10.99 mm
- Weight: 27 g
- Predecessor: Xiaomi Smart Band 7
- Successor: Xiaomi Smart Band 9
- Website: www.mi.com/global/product/xiaomi-smart-band-8/

The Xiaomi Smart Band 8 is a wearable activity tracker produced by Xiaomi Inc. It was launched in China on 18 April 2023 and on 26 October 2023 for the global market. It has a 1.62-inch screen with 490 x 192 pixels resolution, a 24/7 heart rate monitor and a SpO2 sensor. It also comes with a NFC variant.
