= UserVoice =

Software-as-a-Service (SaaS) company

- Type: Private
- Industry: Software, Help Desk, Customer Support
- Founded: 2008
- Headquarters: San Francisco
- Key people: Richard White (CEO)
- Website: https://www.uservoice.com/

UserVoice is a San Francisco–based Software-as-a-Service (SaaS) company that develops customer engagement tools.

== History ==
UserVoice began in 2006, when programmer Richard White decided to create a way to monitor feedback from software users. He created an online forum for users to provide ideas about a project he was designing. White asked users to vote, instead of using programmers, a method inspired by Joel Spolsky, who advocated giving programmers a finite number of votes to prioritize software development. In February 2008, White, along with Lance Ivy and Marcus Nelson, launched UserVoice. An early adopter was Stack Overflow, run by Spolsky. UserVoice had 13 employees and 4,000 clients, with 23 million users participating by 2011.

== Products ==
UserVoice Feedback collects and prioritizes suggestions from customers as they list ideas and vote on them. UserVoice includes a comparison-based voting mechanism called SmartVote. In addition, to the original website-style product, iPhone and Facebook apps are available to allow developers to collect feedback for mobile apps.

UserVoice HelpDesk is a customer support platform for tracking and responding to customer issues. The system includes a feature called "kudos", which allows customers to acknowledge responses." The system uses gamification elements, such as displaying kudos, for support team engagement. Kudos are displayed to team members in real time. UserVoice HelpDesk directs customers to relevant answers as they type questions.

UserVoice kept expanding its product features in the early 2010s. In 2011, they introduced new reporting tools for their customer support platform. These included better analytics options for their “Instant Answers” service. According to TechCrunch, the idea was to help support teams see patterns in their tickets and understand how automated responses were working.

Independent software review platforms have also documented UserVoice’s evolving feature set. Business-Software.com described it as a help desk and feedback tool that includes support ticketing, a searchable knowledge base, user profiles, and dashboards for support staff. This mix of features allowed companies to handle both customer support and collect feedback within a single system.

By 2025, UserVoice had expanded to serve different types of organizations. A review from ITQlick noted that both small startups and bigger companies were using it. The platform helped teams gather ideas, let users vote on them, and use that input to make product decisions.

== See also ==
- Get Satisfaction
- Issue tracking system
