= Customer base =

The customer base is a group of customers who repeatedly purchase the goods or services of a business. These customers are a main source of revenue for a company. The customer base may be considered a business's target market, where customer behaviors are well understood through market research or past experience. Relying on a customer base can make growth and innovation difficult.

Companies with a customer base consisting mainly of large companies may increase their customer base by pursuing small and mid-size companies.

== Legal issues ==
From a legal point of view, the customer base is an accessible collection of confidential data on entities buying goods or using services of a particular entrepreneur, actually or contractually related to that entrepreneur (customers), of measurable economic value, enabling the conclusion or execution of contracts with those customers. Customer base within this meaning generally satisfies the conditions for recognizing it as a type of non-technical know-how. Customer base may be traded, in particular, it may be sold, it is possible to authorize someone to use it. Customer base may be also contributed to the company as an in-kind contribution.

== Building the Base ==
All businesses begin with no customers. These start-ups begin with an abstract idea that slowly evolves into something someone will buy. As these products evolve from abstract ideas into primitive objects that are then further refined, the business that created the product begins to gain customers. The satisfied customers become the repeat buyers and core customer of the company. This is the process that creates the customer base. Most often, successful start-ups begin with low-end or down-market customers with low income and low costs. As the products or services that are being bought are polished and remade, a company gains higher-end customers who gain interest in the product as it reaches higher levels of functionality, use, or value. As the shift to these higher priority customers continue, they begin to be a larger source of income for the company, and slowly become the main base whom the business lends the most importance. This process, of moving from low-end customers to more expensive and more profitable customers, is known as upstreaming, and is an integral part of the theory of disruptive innovation.

Businesses work very competitively to keep their core market intact. The sellers will research their buyers to increase customer awareness. Keeping products customer oriented has become so huge a priority, in fact, that it has become a large focus of business schools to teach all types of business administrators, from manager to marketer, to keeping the customer in mind for the improvement and creation of sellable products. It is very rare for an established company to lose its core customers to incumbents, and it has been stated that when an established company loses their consumer base via sudden and straightforward methods, it was not an ingenious move of the incumbent that allowed this to happen, but rather a result of the established company “dropping the ball.”

== The Customer-Base Customer ==
As companies grow their customer base, and gain experience satisfying them, their customers grow accustomed to that business accomplishing a certain task for them. The company or product’s brand name may even correlate with the task the customer uses it for. Xerox, Kleenex, and Band-Aid are some extreme cases of brand-names being used as the generic name of the product itself. In fact, as long as customers are continually satisfied with their purchases, the act of going to that company’s brand to accomplish a specific task becomes habitual.

Repeat buyers and users are also useful for further reasons, as they are the source of “word of mouth” advertising. Studies have shown that customer satisfaction with a brand leads to more purchases, from both the same and new customers. A satisfied customer expresses their enjoyment in the product, or even shows a friend the product and has them try it out, and a dissatisfied customer may speak against a product or not mention it at all. Of course, the core consumer is the main spreader of the company’s brand name, and the more they use and like what they consume, the more those that surround them will gain interest and then potentially become customers themselves.

== Shifting of Customer Priority ==
Content consumers eventually become fully saturated, and no longer desire the product to be upgraded as it had been before. This customer begins to lose interest and stops becoming a regular buyer for the business. As a company tends to drift upmarket, many lower-end customers do not keep up. These customers then tend to turn to other companies for alternative products or services that have features they value over the original company's usual upgrades. The original company also allows these customers to leave, as they have shifted priority to higher-end customers.

As old core customers lose priority, the company that sold to them does not fight very hard to keep them. Fighting for the old customers could risk losing the new, more profitable people. This allows new start-up businesses to start moving upstream by interesting and attaining these customers for themselves, as the start-up goes through the same cycles that the established company went through. By chasing after higher-end customers and letting less profitable customers lose priority and be taken away from rising incumbents, a business manages to shift its base to entirely new sets of people.
