= IdeaScale =

- Type: Private
- Industry: Innovation Management Software
- Founded: 2009
- Headquarters: Berkeley, CA, United States and Washington, DC, United States
- Key people: Nick Jain, CEO Tim Sussman, Head of Government Solutions
- Products: IdeaScale
- Website: ideascale.com

IdeaScale is a cloud-based software company that licenses innovation management software employing crowdsourcing. The company was founded by Vivek Bhaskaran and Rob Hoehn in Seattle.

As of 2018, IdeaScale is headquartered in Berkeley, CA. In 2023, the company opened its Washington, DC offices.

== History ==
In 2008, the IdeaScale service was first offered. It launched in tandem with President Barack Obama's Open Government Initiative. In its first year, IdeaScale was adopted by 23 federal agencies. It served many organizations, including the Executive Office of the President of the United States.

The company is privately held. It was bootstrapped without venture capital funding and has become profitable. In 2016, IdeaScale acquired Innovationmanagement.se

In 2022, the company hired a new executive, Nick Jain, to take over for retiring CEO Rob Hoehn.

== Features ==
Users create a profile on IdeaScale and once they are members of a community, they can submit ideas, comment and vote on other ideas, and the most popular ideas are prioritized at the top based on the number of votes the idea receives. Once a promising idea has been identified, the software allows teams to form around the idea. The team can add more information to the idea, refine it, propose it to leadership and the best ones are selected using sophisticated decision matrix capabilities.

The company uses the freemium model of engagement, offering free communities on an open basis and additional, customized functionality to paying clients.
