= QuestBack =

Norwegian online survey and feedback software company

Questback
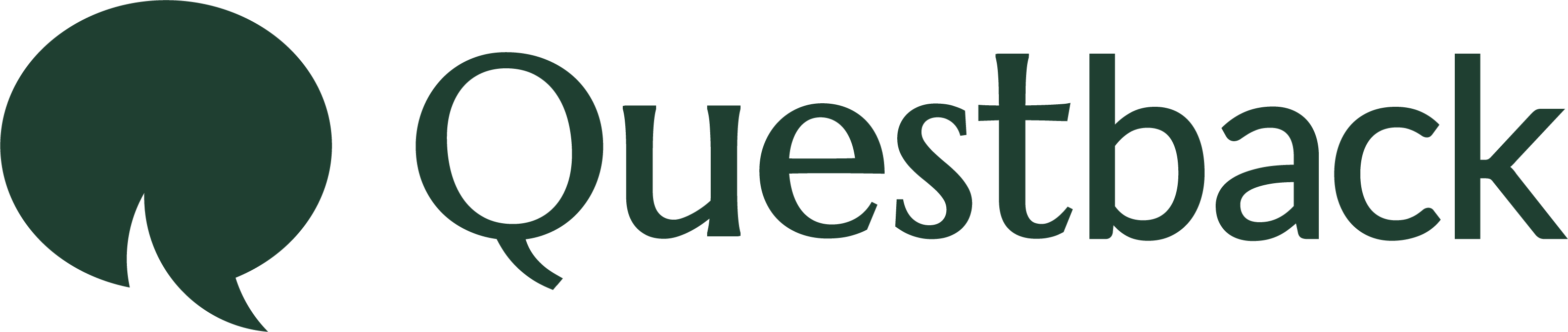
- Company type: Private
- Industry: Research Software
- Founded: 2000
- Headquarters: Oslo
- Key people: Saeid Mirzaie, CEO Sakarias Fasth, CBDO; Bror Elving, CRO; Astrid van den Brink, Vice President Of Professional Services; Christian Egger, Head of Sales DACH Aleksander Utby Tønnessen CFO
- Products: Questback Essentials
- Revenue: NOK 124 mil. (2021)
- Number of employees: 55
- Website: www.questback.com

Questback is an online survey and feedback software company, headquartered in Oslo, Norway. The company offers online data collection and analysis for SMEs and enterprise feedback management, including market research, customer satisfaction, employee evaluations and loyalty, product and concept testing, people analytics and online feedback. Questback serves enterprises in more than 50 countries, with thousands of customers across the globe, and works with over one-third of the companies on the Forbes top 100 list.

== History ==
=== Launch and the early years (1999-2005) ===
The idea for Questback was sparked in 1999 by an article in the Financial Times. The company launched in 2000 with the goal of creating a feedback platform to bring better insights to business. The company's web-based surveys help eliminate the need to execute paper-based surveys for its customers. In 2004, the company expanded to Sweden, and then 11 other European countries in 2005.

=== Company evolution (2006-2011) ===
In 2006, Questback was recognized as Norway’s Entrepreneur of the Year, kicking off years of growth for the company. The company acquired Refleks and Easy Research in Norway and Sweden in 2006, and then Digium OY in 2010. Finally, the company acquired Germany's leading online survey SaaS vendor Globalpark AG in 2011.

Norwegian private equity firm Reitan & Co became the company's majority owner in 2006.

=== U.S. expansion (2012) ===
In January 2012, Questback opened a North American office in Bridgeport, Connecticut, to serve as the basis for an expansion into the U.S. market. The move into the U.S. enabled the company to serve new and existing North American customers.

Since 2012, the company has created a number of offices in North America including New York City, Austin and Houston.

=== Further German expansion and demerger (2013-2021) ===
Questback did successfully expand into the German market over these next 8 years. In 2021 the formerly acquired company Globalpark-Technologie EFS demerged from Questback under the name "Tivian". Questback continued with its DACH expansion project and with its EX and CX Essentials platform.

=== Team expansion and focusing of priorities (2022-today) ===
In the beginning of 2022, Questback refocused its efforts to create a new branch of service and product. The Insight Lab team was founded to support customers with insights that are usually exclusive to CX/EX agencies. Its purpose was to ensure a successful launch, overseeing the health of Questbacks customer feedback projects and to navigate the implementation of measurements in consequence of the findings.

In consequence of the Insight Lab team launch and the development of its REST API, Questback successfully arrived in the enterprise solution segment.

== Market research ==
Questback's online research platform offers a suite of data collection and analytics for monitoring/anticipating consumer trends and attitudes, tracking consumer product adoption and usage, and changing content and attribution for search and social. It also helps to identify new trends and unaddressed consumer demand, gather data from social media and online panels, or loyalty programs.

== Business model ==
Questback's feedback platform is available as a software-as-a-service (SaaS) offering. The company has offices in 19 countries and operates using a direct sales strategy to serve enterprise customers around the world. It also works with partner organizations in the mid-tier space.
