= Sprinklr =

Social media marketing software company

Sprinklr, Inc.
- Type: Public company
- Traded as: NYSE: CXM; S&P 600 Component
- Industry: Customer experience management
- Founded: September 2009; 17 years ago
- Headquarters: New York, New York
- Key people: Rory Read, CEO
- Products: Sprinklr
- Revenue: ▲US$857 million (2025)
- Net income: ▼US$22.9 million (2025)
- Number of employees: 3245
- Website: sprinklr.com

Sprinklr is an American software company that develops a software as a service (SaaS) customer experience management (CXM) platform. The company's software, also called Sprinklr, combines different applications for social media marketing, social advertising, content management, collaboration, employee advocacy, customer care, social media research, and social media monitoring.

Sprinklr was founded in 2009 by technology executive Ragy Thomas. On June 23, 2021, the company went public on the New York Stock Exchange under the symbol CXM, pricing 16.6 million shares at $16 each and raising approximately $266 million, valuing the company at roughly $4 billion.

== History ==
In 2009, Sprinklr was founded by Ragy Thomas, a technology marketing executive previously with the email marketing company Bigfoot International. Thomas initially funded the company himself, with servers operating out of the basement of his home. The company's name came from the metaphor of a brand carefully watering its social media presence. Early customers included Cisco, Dell, and Virgin America.

In March 2015, the company announced the launch of its Experience Cloud platform, a way for companies to manage interactions over 23 social media channels and websites.

In April 2017, the company expanded from social media management to customer experience management, with the launch of new products for its Experience Cloud platform, ranging from social listening tools to content marketing.

In October 2017, the company added eight additional products integrated with Experience Cloud.

In April 2018, Sprinklr released artificial intelligence (AI) capabilities called Sprinklr Intuition, allowing the automatic collection and analysis of social media data.

As of October 2018, it was reported that the company had over 1,500 customers.

In May 2019, the company released Product Insights, an AI capability that automatically categorizes customer comments across social media and review sites about product feedback related to design, packaging, performance or features.

As of December 2019, the company reported over 1,500 employees, and 25 offices in 15 countries, located across North America, South America, Europe, and the Asia-Pacific region.

In 2020, Sprinklr offered case tracking services to the Kerala government in India, as part of an app to assist with managing the COVID-19 outbreak. In April 2020, the opposition party to the government accused the company of compromising patient data related to COVID-19 patients, and criticized the services for being awarded without following proper procedures. The company denied the charges, claiming that the data used in its platform is owned and controlled by the government and stored in India, in compliance with India's data privacy regulations. The government confirmed with the Kerala High Court through an affidavit that the Covid-related data was managed by Kerala's Centre for Development of Imaging Technology (C-DIT) in the Amazon Web Services cloud, and that no Sprinklr employees had any access to the data.

On June 23, 2021, Sprinklr began trading as a public company on the New York Stock Exchange under the symbol CXM.

=== Funding ===
In March 2012, the company received its first outside funding.

In May 2014, the company announced a US$40 million funding round, bringing it to a US$500 million valuation.

In March 2015, a $46 million series E funding round gave the company a value of $1.17 billion.

In July 2016, the company announced a $105 million funding round for a valuation of $1.8 billion.

In September 2020, Sprinklr raised $200 million from private-equity firm Hellman & Friedman in a deal that valued the customer experience management company at $2.7 billion.

=== Partnerships and sponsorships ===
Beginning in 2017, Sprinklr partnered with Forbes to create their "Most Influential CMO" lists, sourcing data from LinkedIn.

In April 2020, Sprinklr became the first advertising partner of TikTok, and expanded the partnership to organic content in May 2022.

In 2022, Sprinklr announced partnerships with Amazon Connect and Twilio, integrating its customer care products.

During the 2022 season, Sprinklr became a sponsor for the BWT F1 Alpine team.

In November 2024, Rory Read was appointed President and Chief Executive Officer. Founder Ragy Thomas transitioned to an advisory role and continued as chairman of the board.

== Acquisition strategy ==
Sprinklr uses its funding to acquire smaller firms that have the tools Sprinklr wants to build itself. To facilitate integration, Sprinklr deprecates the purchased technology and has the acquired company's employees redevelop a native Sprinklr version of the acquired software.

=== Acquisitions ===
In March 2014, Sprinklr acquired Dachis Group, adding abilities for employee advocacy, competitive intelligence, social business consulting services, and content marketing. In August 2014, Sprinklr acquired TBG Digital, one of Facebook's largest ad buying clients, to improve its paid social advertising capability. In September 2014, Sprinklr acquired brand advocacy company Branderati.

In April 2015, Sprinklr acquired Get Satisfaction, a customer community software platform to bolster its customer care product offering. In June 2015, Sprinklr bought text analytics vendor NewBrand. In November 2015, the company acquired data segmentation firm Booshaka.

In April 2016, the company acquired social analytics startup Postano. In December 2019, the company acquired the social advertising business from ad management company Nanigans.

In September 2021, the company acquired AI voice-to-text transcription service platform operator VoiceN.
