= Customer data management =

Customer data management (CDM) is the ways in which businesses keep track of their customer information and survey their customer base in order to obtain feedback. CDM includes a range of software or cloud computing applications designed to give large organizations rapid and efficient access to customer data. Surveys and data can be centrally located and widely accessible within a company, as opposed to being warehoused in separate departments. CDM encompasses the collection, analysis, organizing, reporting and sharing of customer information throughout an organization. Businesses need a thorough understanding of their customers’ needs if they are to retain and increase their customer base. Efficient CDM solutions provide companies with the ability to deal instantly with customer issues and obtain immediate feedback. As a result, customer retention and customer satisfaction can show marked improvement. According to a study by Aberdeen Group, "above-average and best-in-class companies... attain greater than 20% annual improvement in retention rates, revenues, data accuracy and partner/customer satisfaction rates."

== Customer data management and cloud computing ==
Cloud computing offers an attractive choice for CDM in many companies due to its accessibility and cost-effectiveness. Businesses can decide who, within their company, should have the ability to create, adjust, analyze or share customer information. In December 2010, 52% of Information Technology (IT) professionals worldwide were deploying, or planning to deploy, cloud computing; this percentage is far higher in many countries.

== Background ==
Customer data management, as a term, was coined in the 1990s, pre-dating the alternative term enterprise feedback management (EFM). CDM was introduced as a software solution that would replace earlier disc-based or paper-based surveys and spreadsheet data. Initially, CDM solutions were marketed to businesses as software, which were specific to one company, and often to one department within that company. This was superseded by application service providers (ASPs) where software was hosted for end user organizations, thus avoiding the necessity for IT professionals to deploy and support software. However, ASPs with their single-tenancy architecture were, in turn, superseded by software as a service (SaaS), engineered for multi-tenancy. By 2007 SaaS applications, giving businesses on-demand access to their customer information, were rapidly gaining popularity compared with ASPs. Cloud computing now includes SaaS and many prominent CDM providers offer cloud-based applications to their clients.

In recent years, there has been a push away from the term EFM, with many of those working in this area advocating the slightly updated use of CDM. The return to the term CDM is largely based on the greater need for clarity around the solutions offered by companies, and on the desire to retire terminology veering on techno-jargon that customers may have a hard time understanding.

== See also ==
- Customer privacy
- Privacy law
- Information privacy
- Customer data platform
