= Voice of the customer =

Summarizes customers' expectations, preferences and aversions

In marketing and quality management, the voice of the customer (VoC) summarizes customers' expectations, preferences and dislikes. According to the Association for Supply Chain Management (ASCM) the definition of voice of the customer is: "Actual customer descriptions in words for the functions and features customers desire for goods and services". Long term business success involves listening to, analysing and adapting to the VoC.

Companies reputations have been negatively impacted by sources of VoC data, as customers can share word of mouth views on companies and products online. A successful VoC programme involves creating business goals, employee participation, researching customers (understanding the customer journey, gathering feedback and conducting consumer and market research), analysing this data and then refining strategies and products, making business changes or activities such as improving customer service, based on actionable insights.

VoC studies can consist of both qualitative and quantitative research and can be conducted at the start of any new product, process, or service design initiative to better understand the customer's wants and needs, and to contribute to new product definition, quality function deployment (QFD), and the creation of detailed design specifications. Data collected can be organized into a hierarchical structure, and then prioritized in terms of importance and satisfaction with current alternatives.

== Data gathering & analysis ==
Much has been written about this process, and there are many possible ways to gather the information – focus groups, individual interviews, contextual inquiry, ethnographic techniques, conjoint analysis, A/B testing, email, web chats and analytics. Some methods involve a series of structured in-depth interviews, which focus on the customers' experiences with current products or alternatives within the category under consideration. Other techniques involve structuring and analysing information already held by an organisation. Needs statements can then be garnered, organized into a more usable hierarchy, and prioritized by customers.

Modern VoC programs can integrate natural language processing (NLP) to develop themes from open-ended interview questions, allowing companies to act on insights in real time. Companies using advanced NLP, with AI-powered analysis have reported cost savings, improved customer satisfaction scores and increased sales.

Social media listening tools, which report sentiment analysis, can help companies to understand what customers are saying about their brand and products online. Some software tools that utilise deep-learning and AI are able to centralise customer data from multiple sources (unstructured feedback and customer interactions across reviews, support, and social media). Companies that are integrating VoC data into one platform include Oracle and Fujitsu.

== Product development ==
Incorporating the needs of customers at the initial product development stage is much more cost effective compared to doing this after a product is launched. VoC programmes can be adapted so that insights specific to product development can be generated.

Product Managers and marketing employees play an important role in developing and acting on VoC insights, for product development. They should contribute to designing the research, deciding who should participate and what questions should be asked. Often, such personnel will participate in the interviews or observe them. After analysis, the actionable insights can be applied to the product strategy and roadmap.

== See also ==
- User research
- Sentiment analysis
- ITIL
- Conjoint analysis
