= Get Satisfaction =

Customer community, technical support software platform

- Website type: Technical support, Customer service
- Available in: English, Spanish, French, German, Italian, Portuguese, Dutch, Swedish, Norwegian, Danish, and Finnish
- Predecessor: Satisfaction Unlimited
- Owner: Sprinklr
- Creator: Valleyschwag
- Website: https://getsatisfaction.com/
- Registration: Optional
- Launched: September 2007
- Current status: Offline

Get Satisfaction was a customer community software platform for technical support based in San Francisco, California, United States. It was founded on January 31, 2007, by several people, including Lane Becker, Amy Muller, Thor Muller, and Jonathan Grubb. It publicly launched in September 2007. In April 2015, Get Satisfaction was acquired by Sprinklr, a social media management company.

The idea for the service originated from Valleyschwag as a side project. When the Valleyschwag service received over 1,500 subscribers, its customer service requirements increased dramatically. Realizing that customers were actually responding to the issues that other people brought up, the group behind Valleyschwag decided to create the precursor to Get Satisfaction, first named Satisfaction Unlimited, to take advantage of the community's enthusiasm for helping each other. The company describes its product as "people-powered customer service" and "Online Communities. The shortest distance between you and your customer." Get Satisfaction online communities can be a private and/or public place for customers to ask questions, submit an idea or complaint, or give praise. Companies can respond to issues regarding their products or services; official responses are marked as official answers to separate them from other responses. Users can rate responses based on how well they resolve the issue.

Thor Muller explained in an interview with BusinessWeek that the website aims to be simple, noting that most customer-service solutions are too complex. He continues by stating that many are reactive instead of proactive, requiring customers to think as if they were an employee or librarian to find their answers. In contrast, Get Satisfaction approaches the problem by helping companies think more like customers. Muller explained, “We want to create a Switzerland for companies and customers, with specific tools that allow people to get answers to their questions. [...] We want the best answers to rise to the top, and not get buried in online discussion forums.”

The service initially offered paid service plans to companies including Method Products, Timbuk2, Twitter, and Digg. Several more companies later joined the platform, including Time Warner Cable, Verizon, Comcast, Mozilla, Mogo Money, Microsoft Hohm, AMC Theatres, Qantas, Apple Inc., Dell, and Facebook.

The company's CEO was Rahul Sachdev and its CTO was David Rowley. The website, which received an initial round of financing of $1.3 million, received financing from investors that include First Round Capital, O'Reilly Alphatech Ventures, and SoftTechVC. In September 2010, the company announced Series A funding of $6 million from Azure Capital Partners with OATV and First Round Capital participating. In March 2010, Get Satisfaction launched their Facebook application that allowed companies and brands to put their customer community on their Facebook page as a tab.

== See also ==
- UserVoice
- Issue tracking system
