= Customer data =

Type of Data

Customer data or consumer data refers to all personal, behavioural, and demographic user data that is collected by marketing companies and departments from their customer base. To some extent, data collection from customers intrudes into customer privacy, the exact limits to the type and amount of data collected need to be regulated. The data collected is processed in customer analytics. The data collection is thus aimed at insights into customer behaviour (buying decisions, etc.) and, eventually, profit maximization by consolidation and expansion of the customer base.

Customer data may be collected from Internet users through online surveys, but also through the recording of user activity through measures such as click-through and abandonment rates.

== Levels of information ==
One approach to classifying business customer information starts by distinguishing levels of information into market, organizational, business unit, and individual information. Information may then be further broken down within each level. For example, for private consumers, different levels may include personal identifying data, psychographics data, transactional (buying) data, demographic, and financial data.

While some data overlaps between business and individual customers, other business-specific data serves a similar role to demographics in the individual consumer context.

== See also ==
- Audience measurement
- Consumer protection
- Customer data management
- Customer data integration
- Customer data platform
- Customer intelligence
- Market research
