= Webreep model =

The Webreep model (Coker, 2007)

The Webreep model is an information systems theory that explains and predicts website satisfaction, loyalty, and word-of-mouth. The model suggests that four factors (in the model called dimensions) directly influence website satisfaction. Website satisfaction, in turn, directly influences website visitor loyalty and likelihood of referral. Each factor is "shaped" by facets. The four dimensions and factors include:

- Navigation (facets: ease of use, ease of search)
- Content (information quality, information relevancy)
- Performance (page load speed, visual appeal)
- Trust (trustworthiness)

Recent studies have found these four factors account for as much as 87% of the variance in website satisfaction.

== History ==
The Webreep model was developed by Brent Coker in 2007. It expands upon an earlier model developed by Coker in 2005 as part of his PhD research. The inspiration for the Webreep model might have come from Stuart Barnes who developed the WebQual scale with Vidgen in 2001. Barnes was Coker's PhD supervisor for a short time in 2004.

Several of the factors in the Webreep model share similarities to existing information systems models. Notably, ease of use features in the technology acceptance model (TAM) and unified theory of acceptance and use of technology (UTAUT), and trust features in Gefen and Karahanna's trust and TAM integrated model.

The Webreep model combines theories from information systems and marketing. Satisfaction is the primary antecedent of loyalty and word-of-mouth in the model. This part of the model is consistent with marketing theorists who have promoted satisfaction as antecedent to loyalty and word-of-mouth.

== Usage ==
The Webreep model was designed to be parsimonious, in its extended form requiring just 10 questions. For this reason the Webreep model is often used in the field, and is the basis of the website feedback tool 'Webreep'.

The scope of Webreep was designed to be broad, and is currently used to measure website customer satisfaction in a wide range of websites from brochure through to e-commerce.
