= Customer analytics =

Customer analytics is the process of using data from customer behavior to support key business decisions through market segmentation and predictive analytics. This information is used by businesses for direct marketing, site selection, and customer relationship management. Customer analytics plays an important role in predicting customer behavior.

== Uses ==
Retail
Until recently, over 90% of retailers had limited visibility into their customers, but increasing investments in loyalty programs, customer tracking solutions, and market research have expanded the use of customer analytics in decisions ranging from product, promotion, and price to distribution management. One of the most visible uses of customer analytics in retail today is the development of personalized communications and offers and/or different marketing programs by segment. Additional reasons set forth by Bain & Co. include: prioritizing product development efforts, designing distribution strategies and determining product pricing. Demographic, lifestyle, preference, loyalty data, behavior, shopper value and predictive behavior data points are key to the success of customer analytics.

Retail management
Companies can use data about customers to restructure retail management. This restructuring using data often occurs in dynamic scheduling and worker evaluations. Through dynamic scheduling, companies optimize staffing through predictive scheduling software based on predictive customer traffic. Worker schedules can be adjusted in response to updated forecasts at short notice. Customer analytics allows retail companies to evaluate workers by comparing daily sales to daily traffic in a store. The use of customer analytics data affects the management of retail workers in a phenomenon known as refractive surveillance, meaning that collection of information on one group can affect and allow for the control of an entirely different group.

Criticisms of use
As retail technologies become more data driven, use of customer analytics use has raised criticisms specifically in how they affect the retail worker. Data driven staffing algorithms can lead to irregular working schedules because they can change on short notice to adapt to predicted traffic. Data driven assessment of sales can also be misleading as daily traffic counters do not accurately distinguish between customers and staff and cannot accurately account for workers’ breaks.

Finance
Banks, insurance companies and pension funds make use of customer analytics in understanding customer lifetime value, identifying below-zero customers (that is a segment of the customer base that costs more than they are worth) which are estimated to be around 30% of customer base, increasing cross-sales, managing customer attrition as well as migrating customers to lower cost channels in a targeted manner.
Community
Municipalities utilize customer analytics in an effort to lure retailers to their cities. Using psychographic variables, communities can be segmented based on attributes like personality, values, interests, and lifestyle. Using this information, communities can approach retailers that match their community’s profile.
Customer relationship management
Analytical customer relationship management (CRM) enables measurement of and prediction from customer data to provide a 360° view of the client.

== Predicting customer behavior ==
Forecasting buying habits and lifestyle preferences is a process of data mining and analysis. This information consists of many aspects like credit card purchases, magazine subscriptions, loyalty card membership, surveys, and voter registration. Using these categories, consumer profiles can be created for any organization’s most profitable customers. When many of these potential customers are aggregated in a single area it indicates a fertile location for the business to situate. Using a drive time analysis, it is also possible to predict how far a given customer will drive to a particular location. Combining these sources of information, a dollar value can be placed on each household within a trade area detailing the likelihood that household will be worth to a company. Through customer analytics, companies can make decisions based on facts and objective data.

=== Data mining ===
There are two types of categories of data mining. Predictive models use previous customer interactions to predict future events while segmentation techniques are used to place customers with similar behaviors and attributes into distinct groups. This grouping can help marketers to optimize their campaign management and targeting processes.

==== Retail uses ====
In retail, companies can keep detailed records of every transaction, allowing them to better understand customer behavior in-store. Data mining can be applied through basket analysis, sales forecasting, database marketing, and merchandising planning and allocation. Basket analysis can show which items are commonly bought together. Sales forecasting identifies time-based patterns that can predict when a customer is most likely to buy a specific kind of item. Demand-forecasting workflows are also used to improve planning for manufacturing and shipping during new product launches. Database marketing uses customer profiles for effective promotions. Merchandising planning and allocation use data to allow retailers to examine store patterns in demographically similar locations to improve planning and allocation, as well as create store layouts.

== See also ==
- Buyer decision processes
- Business analytics
- Customer intelligence
- Data warehouse
- Psychographics
- Market research
- Customer privacy
- Customer data management
