= Customer intelligence =

Customer intelligence (CI) as part of business intelligence is the process of gathering information regarding customers, and their details and activities, to build deeper and more effective customer relationships and improve decision-making by vendors.

== Customer relationship management ==
Customer intelligence is a key component of effective customer relationship management (CRM), and when effectively implemented it is a rich source of insight into the behaviour and experience of a company's customer base.

As an example, some customers walk into a store and walk out without buying anything. Information about these customers/prospects (or their visits) may not exist in a traditional CRM system, as no sales are entered on the store cash register. Although no commercial transaction took place, knowing why customers leave the store (perhaps by asking them, or a store employee, to complete a survey) and using this data to make inferences about customer behaviour, is an example of CI.

== Process ==
Customer intelligence begins with reference data which contain basic key facts about the customer, such as their geographic location.

This data is then supplemented with transaction data to achieve reports of customer activity. This can be commercial information (for example purchase history from sales and order processing), and interactions with service contacts over the phone and via email.

A further subjective dimension can be added, in the form of customer satisfaction surveys or agent data.

Finally, a company can use competitor insight and mystery shopping to get a better view of how their service benchmarks in the market.

By mining this data, and placing it in context with wider information about competitors, conditions in the industry, and general trends, information can be obtained about customers' existing and future needs, how they reach decisions, and predictions made about their future behavior.

== Example sources of data ==
Speech analytics can be used to monitor telephone conversations taking place between companies and customers, using phonetic analysis or speech to text to find keywords and phrases, classify call types and identify trends.

Customer relationship management are software solutions used for to manage customer relationships which can store data on the quantity, type and category of customer and prospect contacts.

Frontline data capture may (or may not) form part of a CRM software solution, but which is used by front line agents to record more subjective data regarding customer contacts, such as the root cause of the customer picking up the phone (e.g. they received their bill) or their emotional state.

Customer satisfaction and market research surveys, often mined via text analytics, which can additionally be applied, for customer intelligence purposes, to contact center notes, e-mail, and other textual sources.

== Benefits ==
Customer intelligence provides a detailed understanding of the experience customers have in interacting with a company, and allows predictions to be made regarding reasons behind customer behaviors.

This knowledge can then be applied to support more effective and strategic decision making – for example, understanding why customers call makes it easier to predict (and plan to reduce) call volumes in a contact centre.

== See also ==
- Customer analytics
- Customer insight
- Customer knowledge
- Speech analytics
