= Fitness tracker =

Device or application for monitoring fitness

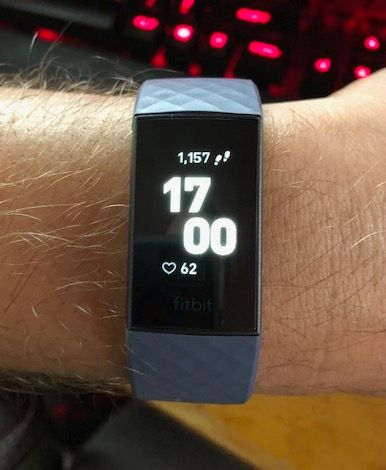
The Google Fitbit Charge 3 activity tracker

A fitness tracker or activity tracker is an electronic device that measures and collects data about an individual's movements and physical responses in order to monitor and improve the individual's health, fitness, or psychological wellness over time.

Many fitness trackers are similar to pedometers, but in addition to counting steps they contain additional sensors such as accelerometers and altimeters to collect or estimate fitness and exercise information, including the speed and distance travelled, heart rate, calorie expenditure, or the duration and quality of sleep.

Improvements in computing technology since the 1980s, driven by the rapid advancement of smartphones, paved the way for wearable tracker devices with integrated sensors. Frequently data such as fitness, mood, sleep, water intake, medicine usage, sexual activity, menstruation, and potential illnesses is synced with mobile apps. This has led to privacy concerns regarding how consumer information is stored and analyzed by the companies involved.

== History ==
Wearable heart rate monitors for athletes were available in 1981. Improvements in technology in the late 20th and early 21st century made it possible to automate the recording of fitness activities, as well as to integrate monitors into more easily worn equipment. The RS-Computer shoe was released in 1986. Early examples include wristwatch-sized bicycle computers that monitored speed, duration, distance, etc., available at least by the early 1990s. By at least the early 2000s, wearable fitness tracking devices were available as consumer-grade electronics, including wireless heart rate monitors that could be connected to commercial-grade exercise machines in gyms.

Fitness trackers later diversified to include wristbands and armbands (so-called smart bands) and smaller devices that could be clipped wherever preferred. In 2006, Apple and Nike released the Nike+iPod, a sensor-equipped shoe that worked with an iPod Nano.

By 2010, logging apps had been introduced, many of which enabled the direct sharing of data to Facebook or Twitter. Fitness trackers became appealing to consumers because of gamification, the social aspect of connected social media, and competition between friends.

In 2016, there were several advances made in fitness tracking for kids, with a variety of options from organizations such as UNICEF and Garmin.

== Tracker formats ==
Most consumer fitness trackers are worn on a wristband similar to a wristwatch. This type of tracker usually includes a digital display for data. Wrist-based trackers may be prone to error during exercise involving rapid arm motion. Many devices primarily intended as smartwatches also function as fitness trackers. An early example was the Apple Watch, which has offered fitness tracker functions since 2014.

Some fitness trackers take the form of a ring. Ring-based trackers have no integral display but rely on connection to a smartphone to display tracked data.

Another format for fitness trackers places sensors inside of earphones. These trackers rely on a smartphone to display data, similar to ring-based trackers. Earphone-based fitness trackers use sensors to take readings directly from the capillaries located within the ear. Due to their placement, these trackers can give results for blood pressure, electrocardiogram, and body temperature more accurately than rings or wristwatches. Fitness trackers placed in the ear are also well suited to the assessment of heart rate.

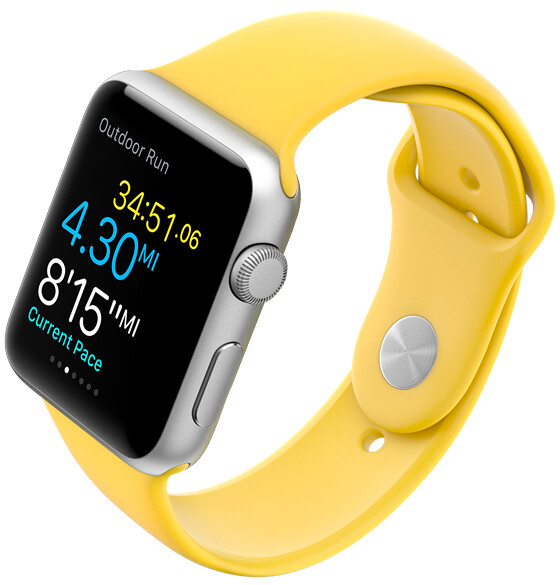
An Apple Watch showing the numbers that track a typical run

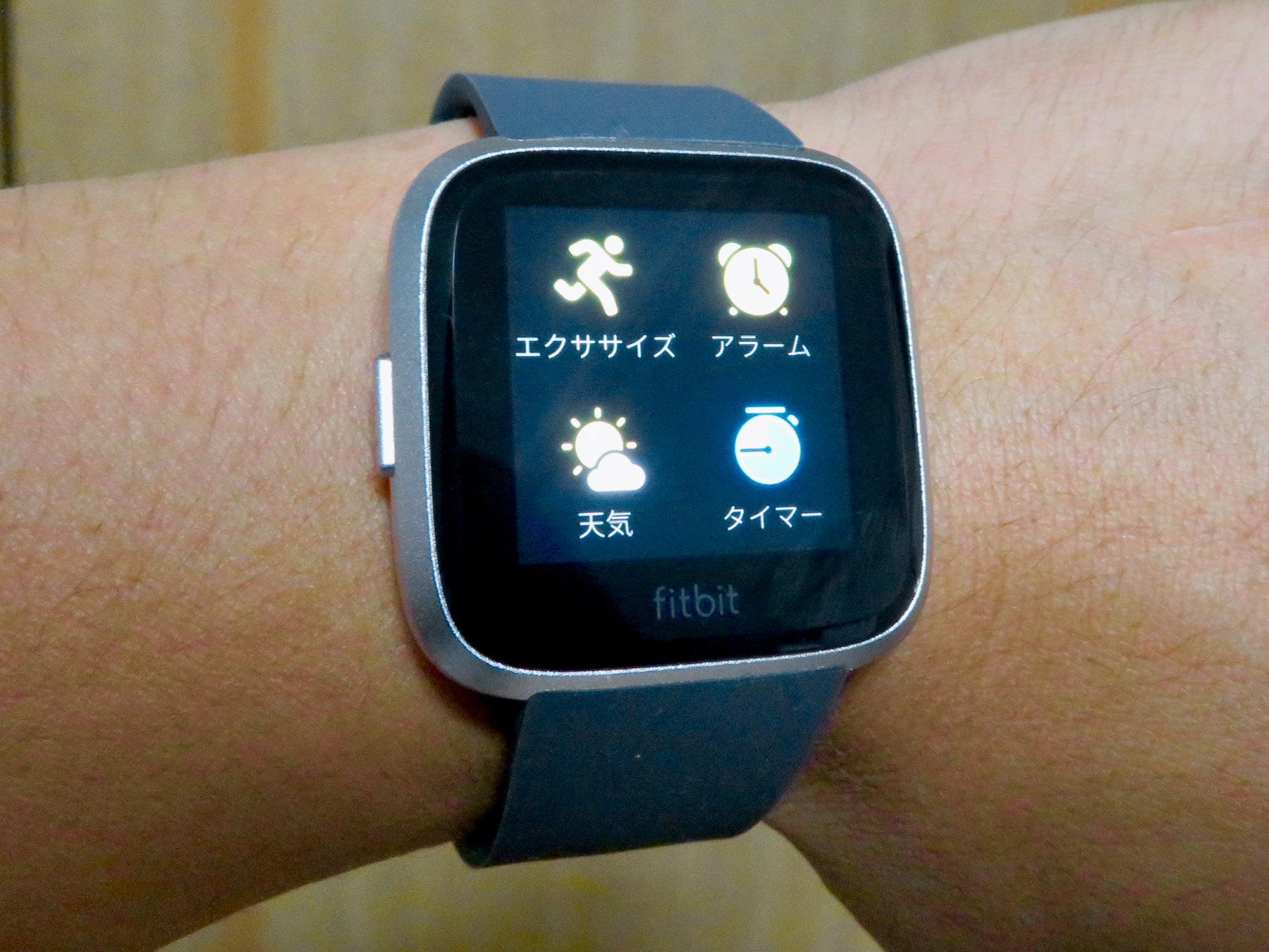
A Fitbit watch showing conditions for a workout

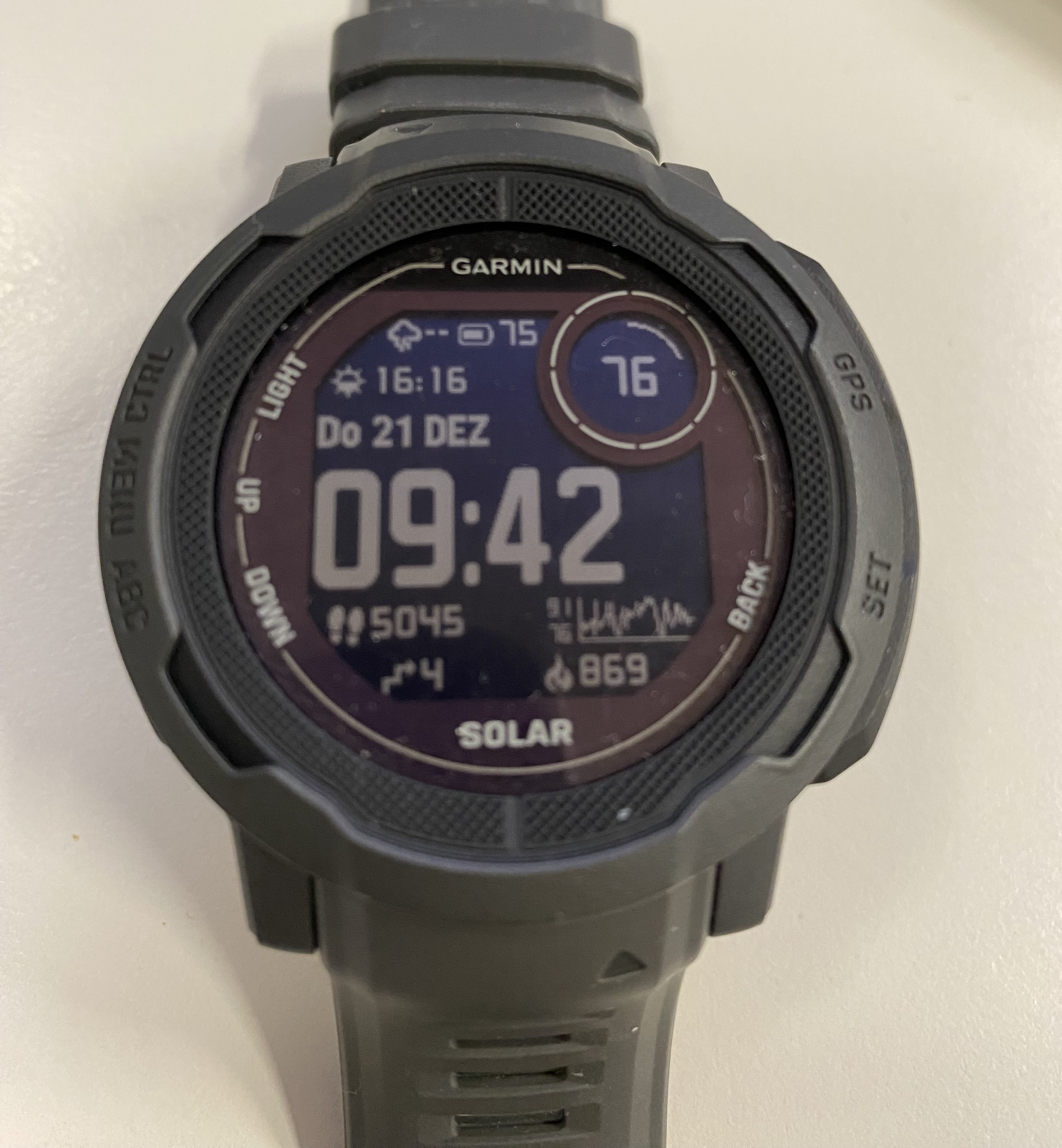
A Garmin watch tracking activity and health data

== Wearable sensors ==
Wearable sensors have been widely used in medical sciences, sports, and security. Wearable sensors can detect abnormal and unforeseen situations, and monitor physiological parameters and symptoms through these trackers. This technology has transformed healthcare by allowing continuous monitoring of patients without hospitalization. Medical monitoring of a patient's body temperature, heart rate, heart rate variability, brain activity, muscle motion, and other critical data can be delivered through these trackers.

Moreover, in sports training, there is an increasing demand for wearable sensors. For example, measurement of sweat rate was possible only in laboratory-based systems a few years ago but is now possible using wearable sensors. Heart rate variability (HRV) has the potential to determine the quality of an exercise regimen. Additionally, HRV is recommended among the athletic community as a warning sign for over-training. In these ways, HRV can be used to optimize performance.

== Medical uses ==
Fitness trackers are not medical devices. However, newer models approach the US definition of a Class II medical monitor, and some manufacturers hope to eventually make them capable of alerting to a medical problem, although FDA approval would be required.

=== Detection of atrial fibrillation ===
Activity tracking has been utilized to keep track of atrial fibrillation (AF), an irregular and chaotic heartbeat, which is accountable for a majority of strokes in the United States. Professionals rely on the ambulatory electrocardiogram (EKG) to record AF but soon found wearable wristbands to be useful for regular usage. These wearables must be accurate to prevent misdiagnosis. The Apple Watch was found in a study to be able to detect and notify the wearer of an irregular pulse. Though there is a risk of false positives, the study found that it may be a useful tool in the initial diagnosis and as a supplemental monitor.

=== Weight loss and obesity ===
Fitness trackers have also been used for tracking and finding solutions to combat obesity by promoting physical activity. A systematic review covering 35 studies and 7454 participants, published in the British Journal of Sports Medicine, found that fitness trackers increased people's physical activity by an average of 1850 steps/day. One review of six studies found, however, that there was little evidence that fitness trackers improve health outcomes. Of five studies that looked at weight loss, one found benefit, one found harm, and three found no effect.

According to another study comparing 8-week interventions and four-month follow-ups of physical activity monitors, a guided weight loss program, and together, activity monitoring and the weight loss program are associated with similar improvements and both combined are associated with more improvements than either alone. It is unclear whether activity changes occur in children and adolescents.

=== Monitoring stress and mental illness ===
Smartwatches have been involved in monitoring stress and other mental health issues. A study was done analyzing the different types of devices, ranging from bulky wearables to smaller, portable devices with sensors that can detect depression, anxiety, and any form of stress. Chest patches are used for measuring heart rate while the wristbands ("Chillbands") were used to track activity, where a correlation was seen in the HR levels and the involvement of circadian rhythm, stress, gender, and age. It was seen that detecting depression alone was challenging, causing a risk of misdiagnosis, but further research along with tracking of sleep, physical activity, mood changes, cognitive function, and social habits help form accurate measurements.

=== Monitoring infant growth development ===
Wearable sensors have also been in use when keeping track of infant development, motor skills, and physical growth are the main aspects that were focused on.

=== Parkinson's disease prediction ===
Physical movement tracking can be used as a predictive analysis tool to determine the risk of Parkinson's Disease in individuals.

=== Alerting for caregivers ===
Other fitness trackers are intended to monitor vital signs in the elderly, epileptics, and people with sleep disorders and alert a caregiver to a problem.

=== Menstrual tracking and reproductive health ===
Fitness trackers can integrate with menstrual tracking apps to keep track of menstrual cycles to spot any irregularities that they would like to bring up to their doctors or specialists.

=== Animal health ===
Fitness trackers have been designed for animals, for example collar-mounted fitness trackers for dogs.

== Performance problems ==
Certain movements of the user can distort the results obtained from fitness trackers as seen in a test conducted by Stiftung Warentest where the products were unable to accurately track a bike ride, and the determined values for the human energy transformation were erroneous. Large deviations in heart rate measurements have been observed from wristlet trackers, so for maximum accuracy it is recommended to use chest straps.

== Privacy concerns ==
There have been some privacy issues regarding the data collection of activity-tracking apps, as a user's health can be tracked into a "digital health footprint". The apps of some fitness trackers transmit personal data and private address lists to servers on the internet without notifying or asking the user. Even when anonymized, the mere presence of geolocation data may be a security risk, as it can reveal the position of military bases, or monitor the movements of heads of state.

There have also been many concerns about privacy issues with menstruation and reproductive health-tracking apps. Many women who use these apps for menstrual and contraceptive tracking are under the impression that their data is private, though there are no universal regulations or regulating organizations, making the availability and protection of the data unknown in many areas. When users sign up for these apps, they are usually led with an "at your own risk" warning in case any data gets leaked, which can contribute to more targeted ads and inaccurate predictions in their cycles.

In the US, in 2013, BodyMedia developed a disposable fitness tracker to be worn for a week, which is aimed at medical and insurance providers and employers seeking to measure employees' fitness. In 2014, Jawbone developed a system called UP for Groups which could provide employers with aggregated data from employees' wearable fitness trackers and apps. More research, as of 2023, also suggests that fitness data can be used to infer sensitive personal information such as personality traits.

== Psychological impacts ==
As of 2021, research had been carried out on the gamification of health apps, where users earn incentives and rewards based on their health goals. Though this can make the app engaging, there was concern it could trivialize health apps and deter the users from their genuine health goals. There was also research, in 2020, raising concerns about how tracking devices affect how we inhabit, experience, and imagine our bodies and lives.

== See also ==
- Sleep tracking
- Actigraphy
- eHealth
- Internet of Things
- Quantified self, movement to record, analyze, and improve one's daily life
- Smartwatch
- Wearable computer
