= Path analysis (computing) =

Path analysis is the analysis of a path, which is a portrayal of a chain of consecutive events that a given user or cohort performs during a set period of time while using a website, online game, or eCommerce platform. As a subset of behavioral analytics, path analysis is a way to understand user behavior in order to gain actionable insights into the data. Path analysis provides a visual portrayal of every event a user or cohort performs as part of a path during a set period of time.

While it is possible to track a user's path through the site, and even show that path as a visual representation, the real question is how to gain these actionable insights. If path analysis simply outputs a "pretty" graph, while it may look nice, it does not provide anything concrete to act upon.

== Examples ==
In order to get the most out of path analysis the first step would be to determine what needs to be analyzed and what are the goals of the analysis. A company might be trying to figure out why their site is running slow, are certain types of users interested in certain pages or products, or if their user interface is set up in a logical way.

Now that the goal has been set there are a few ways of performing the analysis. If a large percentage of a certain cohort, people between the ages of 18 and 25, logs into an online game, creates a profile and then spends the next 10 minutes wandering around the menu page, then it may be that the user interface is not logical. By seeing this group of users following the path that they did a developer will be able to analyze the data and realize that after creating a profile, the “play game” button does not appear. Thus, path analysis was able to provide actionable data for the company to act on and fix an error.

In eCommerce, path analysis can help customize a shopping experience to each user. By looking at what products other customers in a certain cohort looked at before buying one, a company can suggest “items you may also like” to the next customer and increase the chances of them making a purchase. Also, path analysis can help solve performance issues on a platform. For example, a company looks at a path and realizes that their site freezes up after a certain combinations of events. By analyzing the path and the progression of events that led to the error, the company can pinpoint the error and fix it.

== Evolution ==
Historically path analysis fell under the broad category of website analytics, and related only to the analysis of paths through websites. Path analysis in website analytics is a process of determining a sequence of pages visited in a visitor session prior to some desired event, such as the visitor purchasing an item or requesting a newsletter. The precise order of pages visited may or may not be important and may or may not be specified. In practice, this analysis is done in aggregate, ranking the paths (sequences of pages) visited prior to the desired event, by descending frequency of use. The idea is to determine what features of the website encourage the desired result. "Fallout analysis," a subset of path analysis, looks at "black holes" on the site, or paths that lead to a dead end most frequently, paths or features that confuse or lose potential customers.

With the advent of big data along with web-based applications, online games, and eCommerce platforms, path analysis has come to include much more than just web path analysis. Understanding how users move through an app, game, or other web platform are all part of modern-day path analysis.

== Understanding visitors ==
In the real world when you visit a shop the shelves and products are not placed in a random order. The shop owner carefully analyzes the visitors and path they walk through the shop, especially when they are selecting or buying products. Next the shop owner will reorder the shelves and products to optimize sales by putting everything in the most logical order for the visitors. In a supermarket this will typically result in the wine shelf next to a variety of cookies, chips, nuts, etc. Simply because people drink wine and eat nuts with it.

In most web sites there is a same logic that can be applied. Visitors who have questions about a product will go to the product information or support section of a web site. From there they make a logical step to the frequently asked questions page if they have a specific question. A web site owner also wants to analyze visitor behavior. For example, if a web site offers products for sale, the owner wants to convert as many visitors to a completed purchase. If there is a sign-up form with multiple pages, web site owners want to guide visitors to the final sign-up page.

Path analysis answers typical questions like:
Where do most visitors go after they enter my home page?
Is there a strong visitor relation between product A and product B on my web site?.
Questions that can't be answered by page hits and unique visitors statistics.

== Funnels and goals ==
Google Analytics provides a path function with funnels and goals. A predetermined path of web site pages is specified and every visitor walking the path is a goal. This approach is very helpful when analyzing how many visitors reach a certain destination page, called an end point analysis.

== Using maps ==
The paths visitors walk in a web site can lead to an endless number of unique paths. As a result, there is no point in analyzing each path, but to look for the strongest paths. These strongest paths are typically shown in a graphical map or in text like: Page A --> Page B --> Page D --> Exit.

== See also ==
- Funnel analysis
- Cohort analysis
- website analytics
- Big data
- Data mining
- Analytics
- Business intelligence
- Test and Learn
- Business Process Discovery
- Statistics
- Customer dynamics
- Behavioral analytics
