= Arcplan =

Business intelligence software company

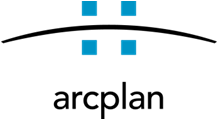
- Type: Public (1993)
- Industry: Business intelligence, Business Discovery, Business Analysis, Software Company
- Key people: Roland Hölscher, CEO; Steffen Weissbarth, COO
- Website: www.arcplan.com

Arcplan is a software for business intelligence (BI), budgeting, planning & forecasting (BP&F), business analytics and collaborative Business Intelligence. It is the enhancement of the enterprise software inSight and dynaSight of the former German provider arcplan Information Services GmbH.

The company got merged with Canada-based Longview Solutions in 2015. Version 8.7. is available in a 32 and a 64 bit version at the moment.

Before the merger the company was managed by CEO Roland Hölscher and COO Steffen Weissbarth.

== Introduction ==
The software supports users especially in the area of business intelligence (BI) that comprises clustered processes to select, evaluate and present data electronically. Furthermore, enterprise planning and decision making processes can be executed via data analysis. Arcplan is usually employed in midsized companies and large enterprises. Public institutions as well use arcplan. In Germany arcplan is developed, distributed and maintained by arcplan Information Services GmbH (Langenfeld, Northrhine Westphalia).

== History and development ==
The Arcplan software emerged from the client server based software Insight in Düsseldorf, Germany in 1993. The founders were the brothers Udo Wollschläger and Frank Hagedorn (both physicists) as well as the mathematician Dr. Hartmut Krins and the chemist Dr. Bernd Fröhlich. Initially, the software development was done by the physicists Udo Wollschläger, Frank Hagedorn, and Svend Dunkhorst. Holding 40% of the capital, the German Lindner Hotels Group was the largest shareholder, the other shares were held by the founders. In 2005 the company was acquired by Frankfurt (Main) based venture capital company Viewpoint Capital Partners GmbH. In 2015 arcplan got sold to Marlin Equity Partners and merged with their portfolio company Longview Solutions.

Insight had an integrated development environment that reflected a flexible editor´s concept. With the help of the editor´s concept users were enabled to create customized reports via Drag & Drop without any programming skills. The editor´s concept in general and the drag & drop report development in particular were innovations in comparison to the competition.

In the early 90s arcplan was one of the first software programs to directly access SAP data for reporting and analysis.

In 1996 Insight being the integrated development environment became part of the webserver based software Dynasight. Dynasight was one of the first software solutions to integrate corporate management. It enabled the access to business applications via a Java-capable browser. After having developed Dynasight to a business intelligence platform, dynaSight (Version 4.1) evolved to arcplan Enterprise (Version 5.0) in March 2006. Since September 2013 the business intelligence platform is available as arcplan 8 providing three modules for a different scope of applications. With the release of version 8, HTML5 is supported; furthermore the access via mobile devices was simplified by implementing a responsive design approach.

Before the merger Arcplan had offices in Germany, the United States, Switzerland and Singapore. Arcplan resellers were located in the People´s Republic of China, Korea, Chile, Finland and Russia. The company employed around 100 people globally before the merger.

== Scope of applications ==
The software meets the typical requirements of a business intelligence application and offers, depending on the package, several additional functionalities. The integrated platform for reporting and planning is looked upon as a unique selling proposition by IT market research provider Gartner Inc.

=== Scope of applications (selection) ===
- OLAP (Online Analytical Processing)
- Reporting
- Balanced Scorecards
- Budgeting
- Analytics
- Planning and Forecasting

In its periodic market study The BI Survey European market research company BARC rated arcplan software as a software for midsized working groups and leading in 8 peer groups.

== Data sources ==
The software provides direct access to the following data sources:

- SAP R/3
- SAP Business Information Warehouse (BW)
- SAP BW BAPI
- SAP BW-IP
- SAP HANA
- SAP Query - Data Extractor
- Oracle DBMS
- Oracle Essbase
- Oracle OLAP Server
- Oracle Enterprise
- Oracle Financial Management (formerly Hyperion Financial Management)
- IBM DB2 & Cubing Services
- IBM Cognos TM1
- Infor (PM OLAP Server, former MIS ALEA)
- Kognitio (Virtual Cubes/Pablo)
- Longview 7
- Microsoft (MS SQL Server - Analysis Services)
- MIK (MIK OLAP)
- Paris Technologies (PowerOLAP)
- Simba Technologies (MDX Provider for Oracle OLAP)
- Software AG (Adabas)
- Teradata (Teradata RDBMS, Teradata OLAP Connector)
- ODBC-, OLE DB-, XMLA-, XML- or every Web service/SOA with open API.

== Customers ==
Arcplan is globally employed by about 3.200 companies. Additionally the software is used in many public institutions such as Swiss Post, the municipal Data Processing Centre city of Frechen (KDVZ Frechen) and the bank of Chile (Banco Central de Chile).

== See also ==
- Business discovery
