= Behavioral analytics =

Behavioral analytics is an advancement in business analytics that reveals new insights into consumer behavior on eCommerce platforms, online games, web and mobile applications, and Internet of Things (IoT) devices. Growth in the volume of raw event data generated by digital platforms has enabled methods that go beyond demographics and other traditional metrics, which describe what kind of people took what actions in the past. Behavioral analysis instead focuses on how consumers act and why, allowing predictions about future actions. Applications include allowing marketers to target offers to specific consumer segments.

Behavioral analytics can be useful as authentication as for security purposes. It uses non-identifiable but individually unique factors to confirm the identity of the user. The identity of the user is authenticated in the background using factors such as mouse movement, typing speed and habits, login history network detail like IP address, browser used, etc.

Behavioral analytics utilizes the massive volumes of raw user event data captured during sessions in which consumers use applications, games, or websites, including traffic data like navigation paths, clicks, social media interactions, purchasing decisions and marketing responsiveness. Event-data can include advertising metrics like click-to-conversion time, as well as comparisons between other metrics like the monetary value of an order and the amount of time spent on the site. These data points are then compiled and analyzed, whether by looking at session progression from when a user first entered the platform until a sale was made, or what other products a user bought or looked at before this purchase. Behavioral analysis allows future actions and trends to be predicted based on the collection of such data.

Since the analysis requires collection and aggregation of large amounts of personal data, including highly sensitive one (such as sexual orientation, sexual preferences, health issues, location, religious affiliation, etc.) which is then traded between hundreds of parties involved in targeted advertising, behavioral analytics is causing significant concerns about privacy violations.

While business analytics has a more broad focus on the who, what, where and when of business intelligence, behavioral analytics narrows that scope, allowing one to take seemingly unrelated data points in order to extrapolate, predict and determine errors and future trends. It takes a more holistic and human view of data, connecting individual data points to tell us not only what is happening, but also how and why it is happening.

== Examples and real world applications ==
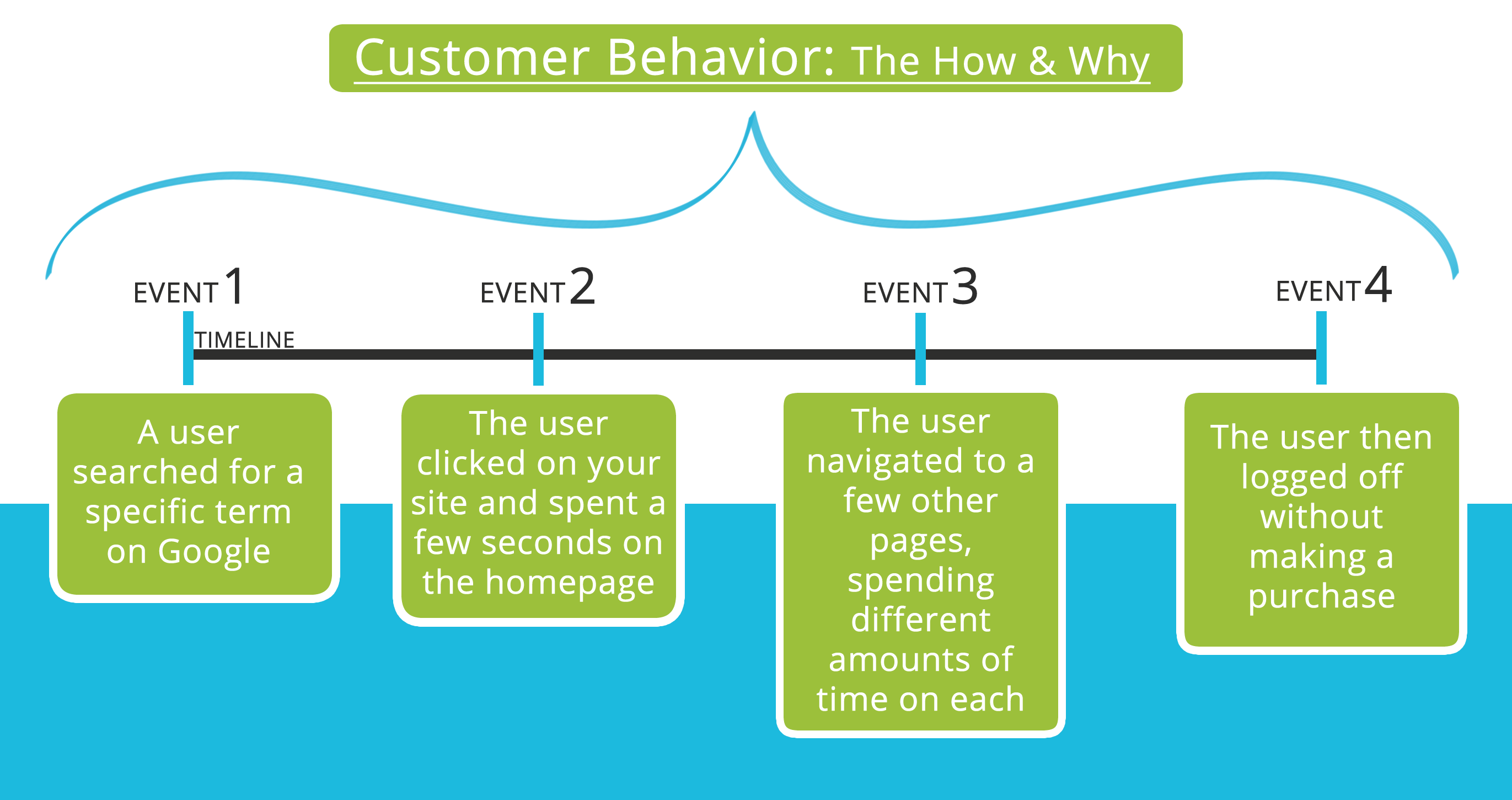
Visual Representation of Events that Make Up Behavioral Analysis

Data shows that a large percentage of users using a certain eCommerce platform found it by searching for “Thai food” on Google. After landing on the homepage, most people spent some time on the “Asian Food” page and then logged off without placing an order. Looking at each of these events as separate data points does not represent what is really going on and why people did not make a purchase. However, viewing these data points as a representation of overall user behavior enables one to interpolate how and why users acted in this particular case.

Behavioral analytics looks at all site traffic and page views as a timeline of connected events that did not lead to orders. Since most users left after viewing the “Asian Food” page, there could be a disconnect between what they are searching for on Google and what the “Asian Food” page displays. Knowing this, a quick look at the “Asian Food” page reveals that it does not display Thai food prominently and thus people do not think it is actually offered, even though it is.

Behavioral analytics is common practice in commercial environments. Amazon.com is a leader in using behavioral analytics to recommend additional products that customers are likely to buy based on their previous purchasing patterns on the site. Behavioral analytics is also used by Target to suggest products to customers in their retail stores, while political campaigns use it to determine how potential voters should be approached. In addition to retail and political applications, behavioral analytics is also used by banks and manufacturing firms to prioritize leads generated by their websites. Behavioral analytics also allow developers to manage users in online-gaming and web applications.

Amongst others, IBM and Intel are creating advanced analytics solutions. In retail, this is IoT for tracking shopping behaviors (in-store tracking).

== Types ==
- Ecommerce and retail – Product recommendations and predicting future sales trends
- Online gaming – Predicting usage trends, load, and user preferences in future releases
- Application development – Determining how users use an application to predict future usage and preferences.
- Cohort analysis – Breaking users down into similar groups to gain a more focused understanding of their behavior.
- Security – Detecting compromised credentials and insider threats by locating anomalous behavior.
- Suggestions – People who liked this also liked...
- Presentation of relevant content (preferences, user groups, etc.) based on user behavior.

== Components ==
An ideal behavioral analytics solution would include:

- Real-time capture of vast volumes of raw event data across all relevant digital devices and applications used during sessions
- Automatic aggregation of raw event data into relevant data sets for rapid access, filtering and analysis
- Ability to query data in an unlimited number of ways, enabling users to ask any business question
- Extensive library of built-in analysis functions such as cohort, path and funnel analysis
- A visualization component

== See also ==
- Analytics
- Big data
- Business intelligence
- Business process discovery
- Cohort analysis
- Customer dynamics
- Data mining
- Funnel analysis
- Path analysis
- Personalized marketing
- Test and learn
- Web tracking
