= Business analytics =

Concept in business analytics

Business analytics (BA) refers to the skills, technologies, and practices for iterative exploration and investigation of past business performance to gain insight and drive business planning. Business analytics focuses on developing new insights and understanding of business performance based on data and statistical methods. In contrast, business intelligence traditionally focuses on using a consistent set metrics to both measure past performance and guide business planning. In other words, business intelligence focuses on description, while business analytics focusses on prediction and prescription.

Business analytics makes extensive use of analytical modeling and numerical analysis, including explanatory and predictive modeling, and fact-based management to drive decision making. It is therefore closely related to management science. Analytics may be used as input for human decisions or may drive fully automated decisions. Business intelligence is querying, reporting, online analytical processing (OLAP), and "alerts".

In other words, querying, reporting, and OLAP are alert tools that can answer questions such as what happened, how many, how often, where the problem is, and what actions are needed. Business analytics can answer questions like why is this happening, what if these trends continue, what will happen next (predict), and what is the best outcome that can happen (optimize).

== Examples of application ==
In healthcare, business analysis can be used to operate and manage clinical information systems. It can transform medical data from a bewildering array of analytical methods into useful information. Data analysis can also be used to generate contemporary reporting systems which include the patient's latest key indicators, historical trends and reference values.

- Decision analytics: supports human decisions with visual analytics that the user models to reflect reasoning.
- Descriptive analytics: gains insight from historical data with reporting, scorecards, clustering etc.
- Predictive analytics: employs predictive modelling using statistical and machine learning techniques
- Prescriptive analytics: recommends decisions using optimization, simulation, etc.

== Basic domains within business analytics ==
- Behavioral analytics
- Cohort analysis
- Competitor analysis
- Customer journey analytics
- Cyber analytics
- Enterprise optimization
- Financial statements analysis
- Fraud analytics
- Health care analytics
- Key performance indicators (KPI's)
- Market Basket Analysis
- Marketing analytics
- Pricing analytics
- Retail sales analytics
- Risk and credit analytics
- Supply chain analytics, an area noted for its "growing importance". DeAngelis refers to multiples interpretations of the term "supply chain analytics". Westerveld notes that the significance of supply chain analytics lies in the importance of aligning corporate strategy and supply chain execution.
- Talent analytics
- Telecommunications
- Transportation analytics

== History ==
Analytics have been used in business since management exercises were put into place by Frederick Winslow Taylor in the late 19th century. Henry Ford measured the time of each component in his newly established assembly line. However, analytics began to command more attention in the late 1960s, when computers were used in decision support systems. Since then, analytics have evolved with the development of enterprise resource planning (ERP) systems, data warehouses, and a large number of other software tools and processes.

In later years, business analytics exploded with the introduction of computers. This change brought analytics to a whole new level and created endless possibilities. Considering, how far analytics has come and what the current field of analytics is today, many people would never think that analytics started in the early 1900s with Mr. Ford himself.

== Challenges ==
Business analytics depends on sufficient volumes of high-quality data. The difficulty in ensuring data quality is integrating and reconciling data across different systems, and then deciding what subsets of data to make available.

Previously, analytics was considered a type of after-the-fact method of forecasting consumer behavior by examining the number of units sold in the last quarter or the last year. This type of data warehousing required a lot more storage space than it did speed. Now business analytics is becoming a tool that can influence the outcome of customer interactions. When a specific customer type is considering a purchase, an analytics-enabled enterprise can modify the sales pitch to appeal to that consumer. This means the storage space for all that data must react extremely fast to provide the necessary data in real-time.

== Competing on analytics ==
Thomas Davenport, professor of information technology and management at Babson College argues that businesses can optimize a distinct business capability via analytics and thus better compete. He identifies these characteristics of an organization that are apt to compete on analytics:

- One or more senior executives who strongly advocate fact-based decision making and, specifically, analytics
- Widespread use of not only descriptive statistics, but also predictive modeling and complex optimization techniques
- Substantial use of analytics across multiple business functions or processes
- Movement toward an enterprise-level approach to managing analytical tools, data, and organizational skills and capabilities

== See also ==
- Business analysis
- Business analyst
- Business process discovery
- Customer dynamics
- List of information graphics software
- Test and learn
