= Business intelligence =

Strategies for analysis and use of data

Business intelligence (BI) consists of strategies, methodologies, and technologies used by enterprises for data analysis and management of business information to inform business strategies and business operations. Common functions of BI technologies include reporting, online analytical processing, analytics, dashboard development, data mining, process mining, complex event processing, business performance management, benchmarking, text mining, predictive analytics, and prescriptive analytics.

BI tools can handle large amounts of structured and sometimes unstructured data to help organizations identify, develop, and otherwise create new strategic business opportunities. They aim to allow for the easy interpretation of these big data. Identifying new opportunities and implementing an effective strategy based on insights is assumed to potentially provide businesses with a competitive market advantage and long-term stability, and help them make strategic decisions.

Business intelligence can be used by enterprises to support a wide range of business decisions ranging from operational to strategic. Basic operating decisions include product positioning or pricing. Strategic business decisions involve priorities, goals, and directions at the broadest level. In all cases, business intelligence is considered most effective when it combines data from the market in which a company operates (external data) with data from internal company sources, such as financial and operational information. When integrated, external and internal data provide a comprehensive view that creates 'intelligence' not possible from any single data source alone.

Among their many uses, business intelligence tools empower organizations to gain insight into new markets, to assess demand and suitability of products and services for different market segments, and to gauge the impact of marketing efforts.

BI applications use data gathered from a data warehouse (DW) or from a data mart, and the concepts of BI and DW combine as "BI/DW" or as "BIDW". A data warehouse contains a copy of analytical data that facilitates decision support.

== History ==
The earliest known use of the term business intelligence is in Richard Millar Devens' Cyclopædia of Commercial and Business Anecdotes (1865). Devens used the term to describe how the banker Sir Henry Furnese gained profit by receiving and acting upon information about his environment, prior to his competitors:

Throughout Holland, Flanders, France, and Germany, he maintained a complete and perfect train of business intelligence. The news of the many battles fought was thus received first by him, and the fall of Namur added to his profits, owing to his early receipt of the news.

— Devens, p. 210

The ability to collect and react accordingly based on the information retrieved, Devens says, is central to business intelligence.

When Hans Peter Luhn, a researcher at IBM, used the term business intelligence in an article published in 1958, he employed the Webster's Dictionary definition of intelligence: "the ability to apprehend the interrelationships of presented facts in such a way as to guide action towards a desired goal."

In 1989, Howard Dresner (later a Gartner analyst) proposed business intelligence as an umbrella term to describe "concepts and methods to improve business decision making by using fact-based support systems." It was not until the late 1990s that this usage was widespread.

== Definition ==
According to Solomon Negash and Paul Gray, business intelligence (BI) can be defined as systems that combine:

- Data gathering
- Data storage
- Knowledge management

with analysis to evaluate complex corporate and competitive information for presentation to planners and decision makers, with the objective of improving the timeliness and the quality of the input to the decision process."

According to Forrester Research, business intelligence is "a set of methodologies, processes, architectures, and technologies that transform raw data into meaningful and useful information used to enable more effective strategic, tactical, and operational insights and decision-making." Under this definition, business intelligence encompasses information management (data integration, data quality, data warehousing, master-data management, text- and content-analytics, et al.). Therefore, Forrester refers to data preparation and data usage as two separate but closely linked segments of the business-intelligence architectural stack.

Some elements of business intelligence are:

- Multidimensional aggregation and allocation
- Denormalization, tagging, and standardization
- Realtime reporting with analytical alert
- A method of interfacing with unstructured data sources
- Group consolidation, budgeting, and rolling forecasts
- Statistical inference and probabilistic simulation
- Key performance indicators optimization
- Version control and process management
- Open item management

Forrester distinguishes this from the business-intelligence market, which is "just the top layers of the BI architectural stack, such as reporting, analytics, and dashboards."

=== Compared with competitive intelligence ===
Though the term business intelligence is sometimes a synonym for competitive intelligence (because they both support decision making), BI uses technologies, processes, and applications to analyze mostly internal, structured data and business processes while competitive intelligence gathers, analyzes, and disseminates information with a topical focus on company competitors. If understood broadly, competitive intelligence can be considered as a subset of business intelligence.

=== Compared with business analytics ===
Business intelligence and business analytics are sometimes used interchangeably, but there are alternate definitions. Thomas Davenport, professor of information technology and management at Babson College argues that business intelligence should be divided into querying, reporting, Online analytical processing (OLAP), an "alerts" tool, and business analytics. In this definition, business analytics is the subset of BI focusing on statistics, prediction, and optimization, rather than the reporting functionality.

== Unstructured data ==
Business operations can generate a very large amount of data in the form of emails, memos, notes from call centers, news, user groups, chats, reports, web pages, presentations, image files, video files, and marketing material. According to Merrill Lynch, more than 85% of all business information exists in these forms; a company might only use such a document a single time. Because of the way it is produced and stored, this information is either unstructured or semi-structured.

The management of semi-structured data is an unsolved problem in the information technology industry. According to projections from Gartner (2003), white-collar workers spend 30–40% of their time searching, finding, and assessing unstructured data. BI uses both structured and unstructured data. The former is easy to search, and the latter contains a large quantity of the information needed for analysis and decision-making. Because of the difficulty of properly searching, finding, and assessing unstructured or semi-structured data, organizations may not draw upon these vast reservoirs of information, which could influence a particular decision, task, or project. This can ultimately lead to poorly informed decision-making.

Therefore, when designing a business intelligence/DW solution, the specific problems associated with semi-structured and unstructured data must be accommodated, as well as those associated with structured data.

=== Limitations of semi-structured and unstructured data ===
There are several challenges to developing BI with semi-structured data. According to Inmon & Nesavich, some of those are:

- Physically accessing unstructured textual data – unstructured data is stored in a huge variety of formats.
- Terminology – Among researchers and analysts, there is a need to develop standardized terminology.
- Volume of data – As stated earlier, up to 85% of all data exists as semi-structured data. Couple that with the need for word-to-word and semantic analysis.
- Searchability of unstructured textual data – A simple search on some data, e.g. apple, results in links where there is a reference to that precise search term. (Inmon & Nesavich, 2008) gives an example: "a search is made on the term felony. In a simple search, the term felony is used, and everywhere there is a reference to felony, a hit to an unstructured document is made. But a simple search is crude. It does not find references to crime, arson, murder, embezzlement, vehicular homicide, and such, even though these crimes are types of felonies".

=== Metadata ===
To solve problems with searchability and assessment of data, it is necessary to know something about the content. This can be done by adding context through the use of metadata. Many systems already capture some metadata (e.g. filename, author, size, etc.), but more useful would be metadata about the actual content – e.g. summaries, topics, people, or companies mentioned. Two technologies designed for generating metadata about content are automatic categorization and information extraction.

== Business intelligence and AI ==
Business intelligence includes the integration of artificial intelligence (AI) and machine learning (ML) techniques into BI platforms to support more advanced analysis, such as augmented analytics, which enhances data interpretation and insight discovery beyond traditional reporting and visualization tools.

=== Generative AI ===
Generative business intelligence is the application of generative AI techniques, such as large language models, in business intelligence. This combination facilitates data analysis and enables users to interact with data more intuitively, generating actionable insights through natural language queries. Microsoft Copilot was, for example, integrated into the business analytics tool Microsoft Power BI.

== Applications ==
Business intelligence can be applied to the following business purposes:

- Performance metrics and benchmarking inform business leaders of progress towards business goals. (Business process management).
- Analytics quantify processes for a business to arrive at optimal decisions, and to perform business knowledge discovery. Analytics may variously involve data mining, process mining, statistical analysis, predictive analytics, predictive modeling, business process modeling, data lineage, complex event processing, and prescriptive analytics. For example within the banking industry, academic research has explored the potential for BI based analytics in credit evaluation and customer churn management for managerial adoption.
- Reporting, dashboards and data visualization, executive information system, and/or OLAP
- BI can facilitate collaboration both inside and outside the business by enabling data sharing and electronic data interchange.
- Knowledge management is concerned with the creation, distribution, use, and management of business intelligence, and of business knowledge in general. Knowledge management leads to learning management and regulatory compliance.

== Risk ==
In a 2013 report, Gartner categorized business intelligence vendors as either an independent "pure-play" vendor or a consolidated "mega-vendor". In 2019, the BI market was shaken within Europe for the new legislation of GDPR (General Data Protection Regulation) which puts the responsibility of data collection and storage onto the data user with strict laws in place to make sure the data is compliant. Growth within Europe has steadily increased since May 2019 when GDPR was brought in. The legislation refocused companies to look at their own data from a compliance perspective but also revealed future opportunities using personalization and external BI providers to increase market share.

== Business Intelligence Competency Center ==
A Business Intelligence Competency Center (BICC) is a team that supports the use of business intelligence in an organization. Since 2001, the BICC concept has been refined through implementations in organizations that have adopted BI and related analytical software.

Usage of the term BICC has varied significantly across implementations in different organizations. The adoption of the BICC concept has led some organizations to establish units that focus on the use of BI software for decision-making, which may increase the value an organization derives from its BI implementation.

A BICC coordinates activities and resources to facilitate a fact-based approach to decision-making within an organization. It has responsibility for the governance structure for BI and the use of analytical programs, projects, practices, software, and architecture. A BICC is responsible for developing plans, priorities, infrastructure, and competencies that can support strategic decision-making using BI and analytical software.

=== Analytics Competency Center (ACC) ===
In recent years, knowledge-oriented shared service centers have emerged in many organizations. Their primary focus has been the offering of analytics and data mining as an internal service across the organization. Such a center may be referred to as an Analytics Competency Center (ACC), Analytics Center of Excellence, Analytics Service Center, Big Data CoC, or Big Data Lab.

By the end of 2017, a report by Gartner Research estimated that approximately 25% of large firms had a dedicated ACC unit (or equivalent) for data and analytics. In contrast to classic BICCs, these centers do not place emphasis on reporting, historical analysis, and dashboards. ACCs aim to enhance a company's data capabilities by building expertise in data analytics, formulating a data strategy, identifying use cases for data mining, and promoting the adoption of analytics within the organization. Although BICCs can change into ACCs, new ACC formations can also occur in practice.

== See also ==
- Agile business intelligence – Use of agile software development for business intelligence projects
- Analytic applications – Business application software
- Arcplan – Business intelligence software company
- Artificial intelligence marketing
- Business intelligence 2.0
- Business intelligence software – Application software to read and analyze stored data
- Business process discovery – Class of process mining techniques
- Business process management – Business management discipline
- Customer dynamics – Theory on customer-business relationships
- Decision engineering – Subfield of machine learning
- Embedded analytics – Type of analytics
- Enterprise planning systems
- Integrated business planning – Type of planning strategy
- Management information system – Information system used for organizational decision-making and coordination
- Mobile business intelligence – Business intelligence systems delivered via mobile device
- Process mining – Data mining technique using event logs
- Real-time business intelligence
- Sales intelligence – Process of managing interactions with customers
- Test and learn

== Bibliography ==
- Kimball, Ralph; et al. (1998). The Data warehouse Lifecycle Toolkit" (2nd ed.). John Wiley & Sons Inc. ISBN 0-470-47957-4.
- Rausch, Peter; Sheta, Alaa; Ayesh, Aladdin (2013). Business Intelligence and Performance Management: Theory, Systems, and Industrial Applications. Springer Verlag U.K. ISBN 978-1-4471-4865-4..
- Munoz, J.M. (2017). Global Business Intelligence. Routledge : UK. ISBN 978-1-1382-03686.
- Chaudhuri, Surajit; Dayal, Umeshwar; Narasayya, Vivek (August 2011). "An Overview of Business Intelligence Technology". Communications of the ACM. 54 (8): 88–98. doi:10.1145/1978542.1978562. S2CID 13843514.
