= Path analysis =

Path Analysis may refer to:

- Path analysis (statistics), a statistical method of testing cause/effect relationships
- Path analysis (computing), a method for finding the trail that leads users to websites
- Critical path method, an operations research technique
- Main path analysis, a method for tracing the most significant citation chains in a citation network.
