= Analytics =

Discovery, interpretation, and communication of meaningful patterns in data

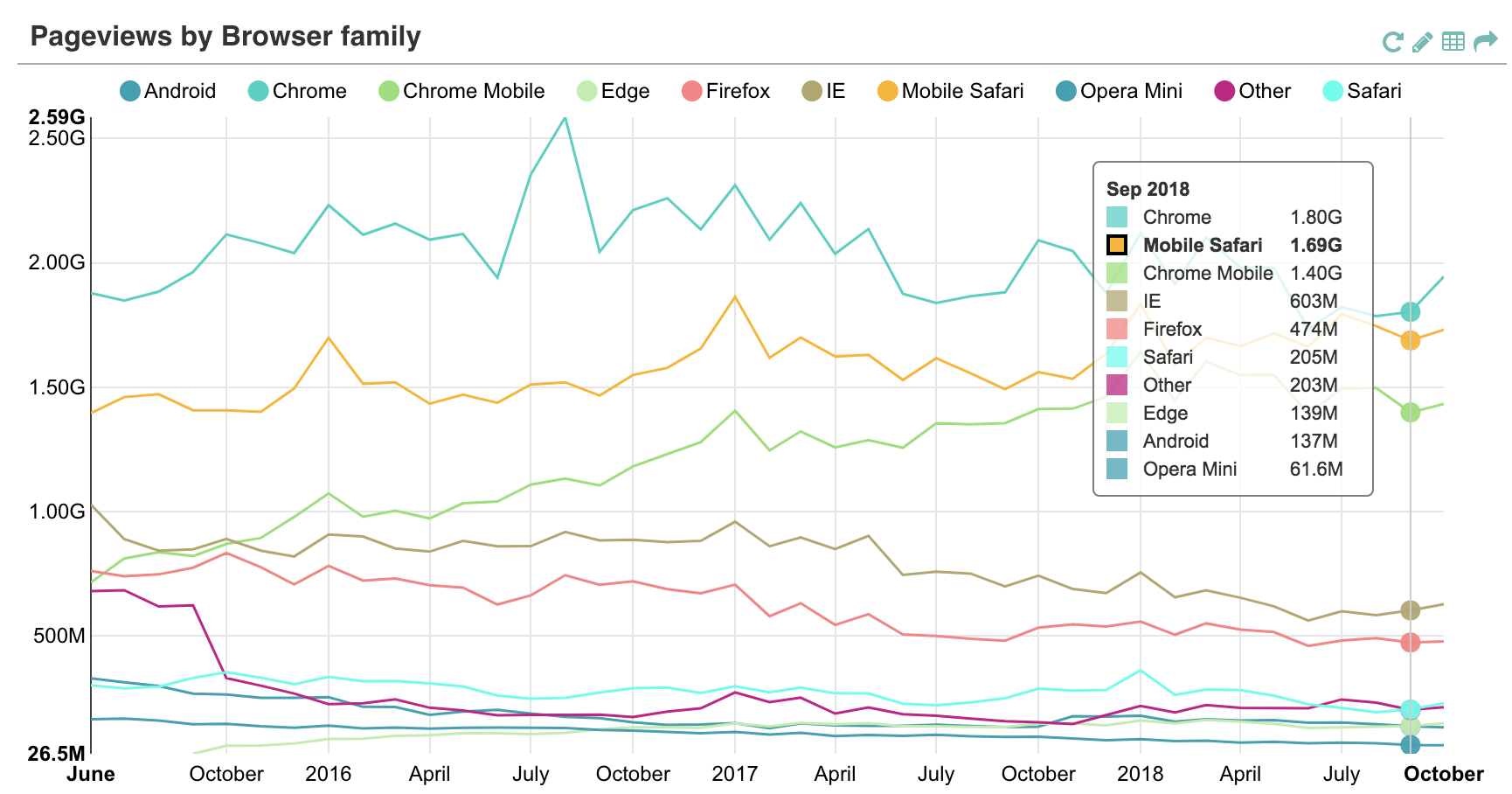
Traffic analysis of Wikipedia

Analytics is the systematic computational analysis of data or statistics. It is used for the discovery, interpretation, and communication of meaningful patterns in data, which also falls under and directly relates to the umbrella term, data science. Analytics also entails applying data patterns toward effective decision-making. It can be valuable in areas rich with recorded information; analytics relies on the simultaneous application of statistics, computer programming, and operations research to quantify performance.

Organizations may apply analytics to business data to describe, predict, and improve business performance. Specifically, areas within analytics include descriptive analytics, diagnostic analytics, predictive analytics, prescriptive analytics, and cognitive analytics. Analytics may apply to a variety of fields such as marketing, management, finance, online systems, information security, and software services. Since analytics can require extensive computation (see big data), the algorithms and software used for analytics harness the most current methods in computer science, statistics, and mathematics. According to International Data Corporation, global spending on big data and business analytics (BDA) solutions is estimated to reach $215.7 billion in 2021. As per Gartner, the overall analytic platforms software market grew by $25.5 billion in 2020.

== Analytics vs analysis ==
Data analysis focuses on the process of examining past data through business understanding, data understanding, data preparation, modeling and evaluation, and deployment. It is a subset of data analytics, which takes multiple data analysis processes to focus on why an event happened and what may happen in the future based on the previous data. Data analytics is used to formulate larger organizational decisions.

Data analytics is a multidisciplinary field. There is extensive use of computer skills, mathematics, statistics, descriptive techniques, and predictive models to gain valuable knowledge from data through analytics. There is increasing use of the term advanced analytics, typically used to describe the technical aspects of analytics, especially in the emerging fields such as the use of machine learning techniques like neural networks, decision trees, logistic regression, linear to multiple regression analysis, and classification to do predictive modeling. It also includes unsupervised machine learning techniques like cluster analysis, principal component analysis, segmentation profile analysis, and association analysis.

== Applications ==
=== Marketing optimization ===
Marketing organizations use analytics to evaluate the outcomes of campaigns and initiatives, as well as to guide decisions related to investment and consumer targeting. Techniques such as demographic studies, customer segmentation, conjoint analysis, and others enable marketers to analyze large volumes of consumer purchase data, survey data, and panel data. This helps them better understand consumer behavior and effectively communicate marketing strategies.

Marketing analytics consists of both qualitative and quantitative, structured and unstructured data used to drive strategic decisions about brand and revenue outcomes. The process involves predictive modelling, marketing experimentation, automation, and real-time sales communications. The data enables companies to make predictions and alter strategic execution to maximize performance results.

Web analytics allows marketers to collect session-level information about interactions on a website using an operation called sessionization. Google Analytics is an example of a popular free analytics tool that marketers use for this purpose. Those interactions provide web analytics information systems with the information necessary to track the referrer, search keywords, identify the IP address, and track the activities of the visitor. With this information, a marketer can improve marketing campaigns, website creative content, and information architecture.

Analysis techniques frequently used in marketing include marketing mix modeling, pricing and promotion analyses, sales force optimization, and customer analytics, e.g., segmentation. Web analytics and optimization of websites and online campaigns now frequently work hand in hand with the more traditional marketing analysis techniques. A focus on digital media has slightly changed the vocabulary so that marketing mix modeling is commonly referred to as attribution modeling in the digital or marketing mix modeling context.

These tools and techniques support both strategic marketing decisions (such as how much overall to spend on marketing, how to allocate budgets across a portfolio of brands and the marketing mix) and more tactical campaign support, in terms of targeting the best potential customer with the optimal message in the most cost-effective medium at the ideal time.

=== People analytics ===
People analytics uses behavioral data to understand how people work and change how companies are managed. It can be referred to by various names, depending on the context, the purpose of the analytics, or the specific focus of the analysis. Some examples include workforce analytics, HR analytics, talent analytics, people insights, talent insights, colleague insights, human capital analytics, and human resources information system (HRIS) analytics. HR analytics is the application of analytics to help companies manage human resources.

HR analytics has become a strategic tool in analyzing and forecasting human-related trends in the changing labor markets, using career analytics tools. The aim is to discern which employees to hire, which to reward or promote, what responsibilities to assign, and similar human resource problems. For example, inspection of the strategic phenomenon of employee turnover utilizing people analytics tools may serve as an important analysis at times of disruption.

It has been suggested that people analytics is a separate discipline to HR analytics, with a greater focus on addressing business issues, while HR Analytics is more concerned with metrics related to HR processes. Additionally, people analytics may now extend beyond the human resources function in organizations. However, experts find that many HR departments are burdened by operational tasks and need to prioritize people analytics and automation to become a more strategic and capable business function in the evolving world of work, rather than producing basic reports that offer limited long-term value. Some experts argue that a change in the way HR departments operate is essential. Although HR functions were traditionally centered on administrative tasks, they are now evolving with a new generation of data-driven HR professionals who serve as strategic business partners.

Examples of HR analytic metrics include employee lifetime value (ELTV), labour cost expense percent, union percentage, etc. Quality of promotion is a metric used to assess a person's promotion decisions. The metric determines whether employees appropriately advanced on objective criteria rather or if a bias is present.

=== Portfolio analytics ===
A common application of business analytics is portfolio analysis. In this, a bank or lending agency has a collection of accounts of varying value and risk. The accounts may differ by the social status (wealthy, middle-class, poor, etc.) of the holder, the geographical location, its net value, and many other factors. The lender must balance the return on the loan with the risk of default for each loan. The question is then how to evaluate the portfolio as a whole.

The least risk loan may be to the very wealthy, but there are a very limited number of wealthy people. On the other hand, there are many poor that can be lent to, but at greater risk. Some balance must be struck that maximizes return and minimizes risk. The analytics solution may combine time series analysis with many other issues in order to make decisions on when to lend money to these different borrower segments, or decisions on the interest rate charged to members of a portfolio segment to cover any losses among members in that segment.

=== Risk analytics ===
Predictive models in the banking industry are developed to bring certainty across the risk scores for individual customers. Credit scores are built to predict an individual's delinquency behavior and are widely used to evaluate the credit worthiness of each applicant. Furthermore, risk analyses are carried out in the scientific world and the insurance industry. Fraud detection is one of the most visible uses of big data analytics. Credit card holders are usually notified of a suspicious charge as soon as it is made and can confirm to the bank or card issuer whether they made it.

=== Digital analytics ===
Digital analytics is a set of business and technical activities that define, create, collect, verify, or transform digital data into reporting, research, analyses, recommendations, optimizations, predictions, and automation. This also includes SEO (search engine optimization), where the keyword search is tracked and that data is used for marketing purposes, and banner ad clicks. A growing number of brands and marketing firms rely on digital analytics for their digital marketing assignments, where marketing return on investment (MROI) is an important key performance indicator (KPI).

=== Security analytics ===
Security analytics refers to information technology (IT) to gather security events to understand and analyze events that pose the greatest security risks. Products in this area include security information and event management and user behavior analytics.

=== Software analytics ===
Software analytics is the process of collecting information about the way a piece of software is used and produced.

== Challenges ==
In the industry of commercial analytics software, an emphasis has emerged on solving the challenges of analyzing massive, complex data sets, often when such data is in a constant state of change. Such data sets are commonly referred to as big data. Whereas once the problems posed by big data were only found in the scientific community, today big data is a problem for many businesses that operate transactional systems online and, as a result, amass large volumes of data quickly.

The analysis of unstructured data types is another challenge getting attention in the industry. Unstructured data differs from structured data in that its format varies widely and cannot be stored in traditional relational databases without significant effort at data transformation. Sources of unstructured data, such as email, the contents of word processor documents, PDFs, geospatial data, etc., are rapidly becoming a relevant source of business intelligence for businesses, governments, and universities.

These challenges are the current inspiration for much of the innovation in modern analytics information systems, giving birth to relatively new machine analysis concepts such as complex event processing, full text search and analysis, and even new ideas in presentation. One such innovation is the introduction of grid-like architecture in machine analysis, allowing increases in the speed of massively parallel processing by distributing the workload to many computers all with equal access to the complete data set.

Analytics is increasingly used in education, particularly at the district and government office levels. However, the complexity of student performance measures presents challenges when educators try to understand and use analytics to discern patterns in student performance, predict graduation likelihood, improve chances of student success, etc. For example, in a study involving districts known for strong data use, teachers were given scenarios with hypothetical student data: the percentage of correct responses was 56% on the question-posing item, 64% on the data-comprehension items and 48% on the data-interpretation items. To combat this, some analytics tools for educators adhere to an over-the-counter data format (embedding labels, supplemental documentation, and a help system, and making key package/display and content decisions) to improve educators' understanding and use of the analytics being displayed.

=== Risks ===
Risks for the general population include discrimination on the basis of characteristics such as gender, skin colour, ethnic origin, or political opinions through mechanisms such as price discrimination or statistical discrimination.

== See also ==
- Analysis
- Analytic applications
- Architectural analytics
- Behavioral analytics
- Business analytics
- Business intelligence
- Cloud analytics
- Complex event processing
- Continuous analytics
- Cultural analytics
- Customer analytics
- Dashboard (business)
- Data mining
- Data presentation architecture
- Embedded analytics
- Learning analytics
- List of software engineering topics
- Mobile Location Analytics
- News analytics
- Online analytical processing
- Online video analytics
- Operational reporting
- Operations research
- Prediction
- Predictive analytics
- Predictive engineering analytics
- Prescriptive analytics
- Semantic analytics
- Smart grid
- Social analytics
- Software analytics
- Speech analytics
- Statistics
- User behavior analytics
- Visual analytics
- Web analytics
- Win–loss analytics
