= Enterprise planning system =

An enterprise planning system covers the methods of planning for the internal and external factors that affect an enterprise.

These factors generally fall under PEST analysis (PESTLE) which refers to political, economic, social, technological, legal and environmental factors. Regularly addressing PESTLE factors falls under operations management. Meanwhile, addressing any event, opportunity or challenge in any one or many factors for the first time will involve project management.

As opposed to enterprise resource planning (ERP), enterprise planning systems have broader coverage. Enterprise planning systems address the resources that are available or not available to an enterprise and its ability to produce products or resources and/or provide services. It also considers those factors that will positively or negatively affect the firm's ability to run these actions.

Enterprise planning systems will tend to vary and are flexible. These are due to the periodic and adaptive nature of strategy formation. These will also have tactical aspects. Typically, enterprise planning systems are part of a firm's knowledge base or corporate structure whether it formally identified and structured or simply executed these when the need appeared.

== Purposes ==
An enterprise planning system will address at least three basic purposes to help the enterprise:

- survive
- compete
- thrive

=== Survival ===
An enterprise will plan for tactical moves for quick reaction to the PESTLE threats that affect its survival. For instance, right after Japan's Fukushima nuclear power plant has experienced explosions due to the earthquake and the tsunami that followed, several enterprises (within and outside Japan) publicly announced their course of actions to address the emergency.

=== Competition ===
Meanwhile, an enterprise will plan for longer term strategic actions to address its competition or improve its competitiveness. For instance, enterprises will plan for, set budgets, implement and use strategic information systems as “information systems or information technology investments can be a source of competitive advantage”.

=== Opportunities ===
Most significantly, an enterprise will plan for using the PESTLE opportunities that are available to it. The profit and benefit motives justify most enterprise planning systems.

=== Vulnerabilities ===
A fourth noteworthy purpose for enterprise planning systems is preparedness against terrorist attacks. As noted in the US Presidential Directive for Critical infrastructure protection, terrorist groups are likely to attack commercial infrastructure for economic sabotage. Enterprises that are providing products or services that are critical to the economic system of a nation are potential targets of extremists.

== Strategic planning ==
Two major characteristics of EPSs are (1) variety and (2) flexibility. For instance, technological risks abound as even enterprise software are prone to obsolescence and disruptive innovations. Technology is not stagnant. Thus, variety and flexibility work to the advantage of a strategically adaptive or agile enterprise as PESTLE conditions change.

To illustrate this some more, ERP software prescribes processes to realize its promised benefits. However, compliance to these rigid, prescribed processes is often assumed rather than real. In many cases, the ERP software is accepted but the practices within the enterprise reflect inconsistencies with the prescribed processes of the software. In a sense, variety and flexibility in a standard ERP implementation will still manifest in many ways such as "workarounds, shadow systems, various forms of unintended improvisations, and organizational 'drift'" as the knowledge workers in the enterprise adapt to the realities of daily activities.

With changing real world conditions, at least three components can structure enterprise strategy. These are:

- analytical frameworks for the evaluation of PESTLE data at a given time
- geographic coverage of operations to manage risks or maximize benefits from macroeconomic forces or government regulations
- projects integration to efficiently support enterprise operations

=== Strategy via analysis ===
Frameworks of analysis usually drive a firm's strategy. These enable the firm to cope with the actions of its competitors, demands of its consumers or clients, nature of its operating environments, effects of government regulations in the places where it does business, or opportunities that are available among other factors. Here, team planning is crucial. One group will normally specialize in one aspect like operations or government regulations. Managing the interrelation of PESTLE factors requires teamwork in the enterprise planning process.

A sample framework for general analysis is the SWOT analysis. Another is the Balanced Scorecard for performance measurement analysis.

=== Strategy via geography ===
Enterprise strategy can also refer to the mix of structured actions that address the political, economic, social, technological, legal and environmental factors that affect a business or firm. These structured actions can be local, transnational, global or combination of local, transnational or global. Hence, enterprises can have any of the following geographic strategies in their plans:

- local strategy
- regional strategy (Europe, North America, Asia-Pacific, etc.)
- international strategy
- global strategy
- global and local strategy

=== Strategy via projects integration ===
Moreover, since management actions occur simultaneously in an enterprise, strategic planners can consider operations or project portfolio management (PPM) as crucial elements in an enterprise's strategic planning guide.

For instance, the need to have strategic priorities across many projects in companies with multiple product development projects have made executives borrow principles from investment portfolio management to better manage the distribution of resources compared with the assessed risks for each project.

Thus, PESTLE factors lead to strategy formation that will enable the enterprise to adapt to changing conditions. Meanwhile, the strategies that have been formed from the analytical framework processes of evaluating an enterprise's condition will lead to detailed plans which could be part of a firm's manual of operations or projects portfolio thrusts for funding and execution across the units or geographic coverage of the enterprise.

== Planning and budgeting ==
Enterprise planning and budgeting go hand-in-hand as the wherewithal to execute plans will determine the success or failure of an enterprise strategy. In another light, expanding or limiting the budget for a particular operations aspect of the enterprise or an ongoing project in favor of another will signal changes to an enterprise's strategy. Hence, planning and budgeting are integral parts of any enterprise planning systems as these impact the strategic directions of the enterprise.

For instance, enterprise projects tend to be mutually dependent with other projects to leverage a firm's engineering, financial and technology resources. A market research project will trigger a research, development and engineering (RD&E) project for a new product. In turn, this RD&E project could trigger a production strategy project to manufacture the new product at the most efficient locations to bring it closer to its target consumers. Hence, cutting the RD&E project budget in half or increasing it twice will have profound effects in the long term direction of an enterprise as this will affect the other units of the firm undertaking projects that are linked to the RD&E project.

=== Classifications ===
Enterprise planning and budgeting can be generally classified into:

- Centralized. Headquarters or executive management directs all planning and budgets from the top then downwards in the organization hierarchy. It will closely follow Frederick Winslow Taylor's Principles of Scientific Management.
- Devolved. Middle managers set plans effectively steering the enterprise's strategic direction. Executive management takes into account that the enterprise has knowledge workers that are experts in their respective fields. The Management Board approves the proposed strategic direction under certain financial constraints such as expected returns on investment or equity.
- Hybrid. Executive management determines and sets the strategic direction of the enterprise based on the inputs of middle managers and the rank and file. In this set up, plans and budgets are negotiated.

Essentially, enterprise plans and budgets can be detailed in a top-down approach, generalized in a bottom-up approach, or combined in a top-down and bottom-up approach.

== Group planning ==
Enterprise group planning will typically refer to the involvement of the major units of an enterprise such as the finance, marketing, production or technology departments. It can also refer to the involvement of the geographic units of a transnational or global firm. Some enterprises also involve external parties in their group planning where inputs from the crucial parts of the supply chain, cooperation and collaboration, or outsiders-looking-in are part of the firm's strategy.

Enterprise group planning will usually manifest in regular board of directors' or management committee' meetings with varying frequencies such as monthly, quarterly or annually. Traditional meetings have required the physical presences of representatives from the various business units of the enterprise. With improvements in telecommunications, enterprise group planning can be conducted through video conferencing where participants may be dispersed geographically. However, video conferencing still appears to be an inadequate substitute when warm, interpersonal relations are part of the firm's culture.

Yet for fast-paced events like natural disasters or a meltdown of the financial markets that require immediate action from the enterprise, video conferencing might be the only option. Troubleshooting that requires the major resources of the enterprise will also entail enterprise group planning. Here, enterprise planning systems take a tactical form rather than a strategic focus to preserve the stability or ensure the survival of the enterprise.

== Transition plan ==
Enterprise transition plans will generally refer to change management-related actions in the case of mergers or in the implementation of an enterprise-wide project. The transition plan will cover the elimination of redundant functions in the case of a merger or the incorporation of new processes into business operations in the case of a technology project.

== Planning software ==
Enterprise planning software will have varied or depth of coverage but will not essentially refer to enterprise resource planning software. This will include planning-centric software and the tools to support strategic and tactical planning for and across the enterprise, such as:

- strategy formation and scenario planning software (for example, supporting Sales and operations planning process)
- performance measurement and evaluation software
- project management software
- data warehouse or business intelligence software
- enterprise optimization software

== See also ==
- Business intelligence
- Business process management
- Enterprise information system
- Enterprise system
- Management information system
- Supply chain management
