= Analytic applications =

Business application software

Analytic applications are a type of business application software, used to measure and improve the performance of business operations. More specifically, analytic applications are a type of business intelligence. As such they use collections of historical data about business operations to provide business users with information and tools that allow them to make improvements in business functions.

The maturity levels for business intelligence are:

- operational reporting
- analytic reporting
- business dashboards
- analytic applications

It may extend further to predictive analytics, or predictive analysis may form part of the analytic application - depending on both the subject matter under analysis, and the nature of the analysis required.

Analytic applications are typically described as a subset of performance management. They specifically relate to the analysis of a business process (such as sales pipeline analysis, accounts payable analytics, or risk adjusted profitability analysis) in support of decision making.

To qualify as an application (rather than simply as a data warehousing tool), these tools should promote some form of automation. The maturity level of this automation is as follows:

- reading data from a nominated operational system (ERP, CRM, SCM, etc.) into a data warehouse optimized for analysis (data led automation),
- reports, dashboards and scorecards based on that data structure (reporting led automation),
- what-if analysis and scenario-modeling (predictive or analytic led automation).

In most cases, these three levels are discrete functions, loosely banded together as a single product, and there is little automation of the process from end to end.
