= Employee lifetime value =

Total value an employee brings to an organization

Employee lifetime value (ELTV) is a human resources people analytics metric to estimate the total value an employee will bring to an organization throughout their tenure with a company. The term for the metric was coined by Maia Josebachvili.

ELTV encompasses various factors, such as the employee's contributions, performance, skills, and potential impact on business growth; and helps a business to decide how much to invest in employee recruitment, retention, and development. ELTV estimates the return on investment (ROI) of an employee.
