= Task Force on Process Mining =

- Founded: 2006
- Founder: Eindhoven University of Technology
- Key people: Boudewijn van Dongen (Steering Committee Chair); Wil van der Aalst (Vice-chair); Moe Wynn (Vice-chair)
- Website: https://www.tf-pm.org/

The IEEE Task Force on Process Mining (TFPM) is a non-commercial association for process mining. The IEEE (Institute of Electrical and Electronics Engineers) Task Force on Process Mining was established in October 2009 as part of the IEEE Computational Intelligence Society at the Eindhoven University of Technology.

The task force is supported by over 80 organizations and has around 750 members. The main goal of the task force is to promote the research, development, education, and understanding of process mining.

== About ==
In 2012, the IEEE World Congress on Computational Intelligence/ IEEE Congress on Evolutionary Computation held a session on Process Mining. Process mining is a type of research that is a mix of computational intelligence and data mining, as well as process modeling and analysis.

=== Activities and organization ===
The Task Force on Process Mining has a Steering Committee and an Advisory Board. The Steering Committee, was chaired by Wil van der Aalst in its inception in 2009, defined 15 action lines. These include the organization of the annual International Process Mining Conference (ICPM) series, standardization efforts leading to the IEEE XES standard for storing and exchanging event data, and the Process Mining Manifesto which was translated into 16 languages. The Task Force on Process Mining also publishes a newsletter, provides data sets, organizes workshops and competitions, and connects researchers and practitioners.

In 2016, the IEEE Standards Association published the IEEE Standard for Extensible Event Stream (XES), which is a widely accepted file format by the process mining community.

As of 2023, Boudewijn van Dongen serves as chair of the Steering Committee. Wil van der Aalst and Moe Wynn both serve as vice-chair of the Steering Committee.

== See also ==
- Process mining
- Business process management
