= Reporting =

Reporting may refer to

- any activity that leads to reports
- in particular business reporting
- Data reporting
- Sustainability reporting
- Financial reporting
- international reporting of financial information for tax purposes under the OECD's Common Reporting Standard
- Journalism
- Court reporting
- Traffic reporting
- Beat reporting
- Operational reporting
