= Funnel analysis =

In business intelligence

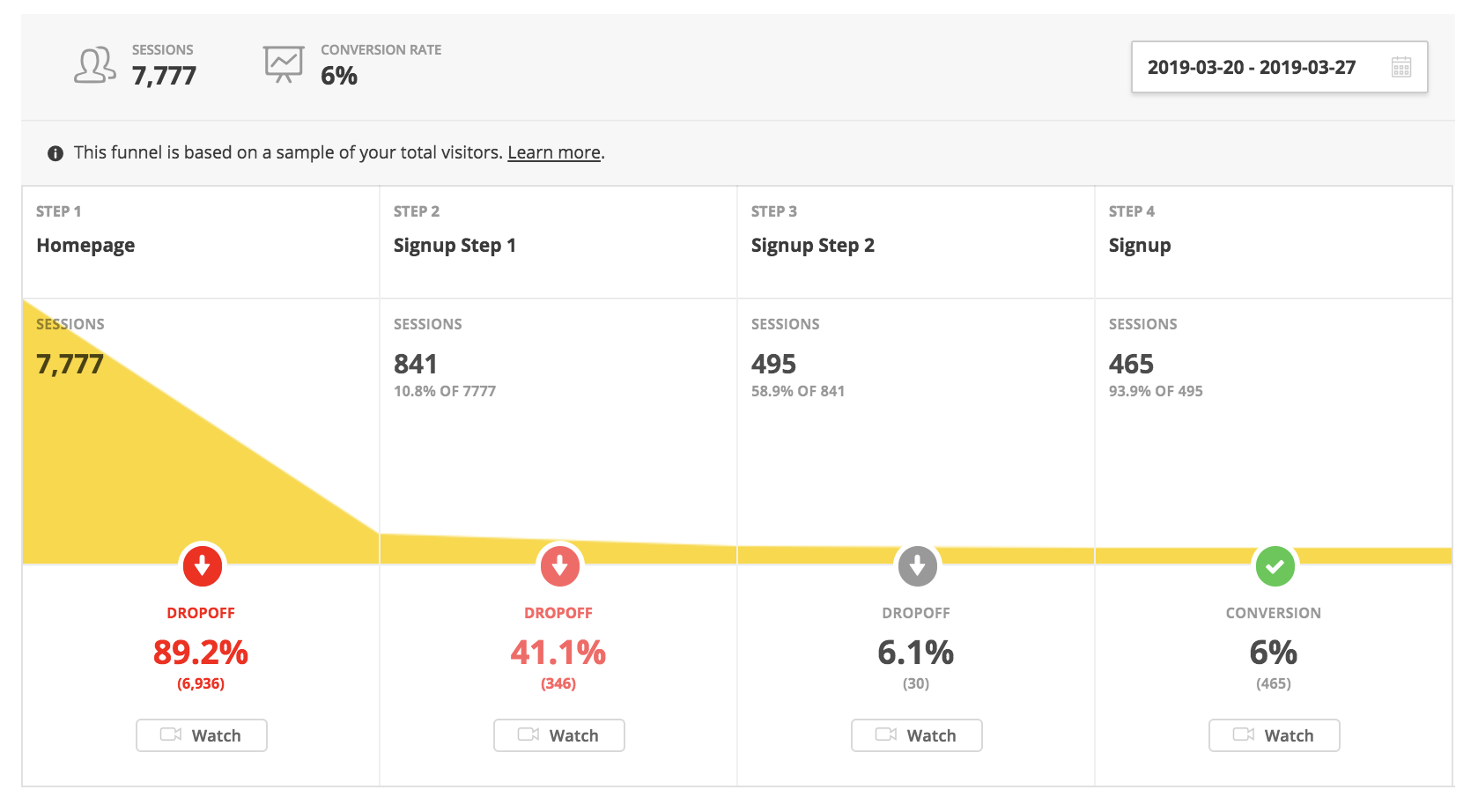
An example of funnel visualization

Funnel analysis involves mapping and analyzing a series of events that lead towards a defined goal, like an advertisement-to-purchase journey in online advertising, or the flow that starts with user engagement in a mobile app and ends in a sale on an eCommerce platform. Funnel analyses "are an effective way to calculate conversion rates on specific user behaviors". This can be in the form of a sale, registration, or other intended action from an audience.

The term 'funnel analysis' comes from the analogy with a physical kitchen or garage funnel, which gets narrower along its length, allowing less volume to pass through it. Similarly, an analytics funnel helps visualize how a large number of individuals enter the funnel, yet only a small proportion of them will perform the intended actions and reach the end goal on a website, eCommerce platform, application, or online game.

== Real world applications ==
An example of how a company would use funnel analytics is by focusing on drawing actionable insights from funnels. Funnel analysis can be used to determine conversion and user fallout rates in a given funnel. An analysis to determine the steps that lead to a desired goal in order to improve future interactions in the same funnel can be done for further success. To illustrate further, looking at how many users actually make it to the end of the funnel, for example to make a purchase or register, compared with how many do not.

By continuously monitoring and analyzing funnels, it is possible to assess if changes to an application or platform are having a positive effect on conversion. For instance, one might find that only 10% of users who come to a platform and enter the registration funnel actually reach the goal of completing registration. Using the funnel analytics process, it is then possible to tweak settings or features within the funnel in order to see what makes that number improve. Or when creating a marketing campaign, there is a chance to analyze how well the campaign is working by monitoring a funnel that brings users from the initial event all the way to purchasing a product.

Funnel analysis helps determine the point in which users are dropping off. The next step is to understand why they're dropping off, in order to reduce drop off rates and in turn increase overall conversion.

Critics state the funnel, as a linear approach, is getting less relevant in today’s marketing. Today, Consumer experience tends to be a more varied journey. Instead of just narrowing their options, they expand their research further to help them reach a decision. When they make a purchase, consumers share their opinion of the brand, whether it be good or bad. They also set a standard based on their experience with the best brands, which affects their brand relationships.

== Conversion funnel ==
In e-commerce, the conversion funnel is the journey a consumer takes through an Internet advertising or search system, navigating an e-commerce website, and finally making a purchase. The consumer is seen as being "converted" from a visitor to the site to a buyer.

A funnel describes the progressive reduction in the number of users at each stage of the process. Advertising efforts can be aimed at "upper funnel", "middle funnel", or "lower funnel" potential customers.

Typically a large number of customers search for a product or service or register as page view on a referring page that is linked to the e-commerce site by a banner ad, ad network or conventional link. Only a small proportion of those seeing the advertisement or link actually click the link. The metric used to describe this ratio is the click-through rate (CTR) and represents the top level of the funnel. Typical banner and advertising click-through rates are 0.02% in late 2010 and have decreased over the past three years. Click-through rates are highly sensitive to small changes such as link text, link size, link position and many others and these effects interact cumulatively. The process of understanding which creative material brings the highest click-through rate is known as ad optimization.

Once the link is clicked and the visitor to the referring page enters the e-commerce site itself, only a small proportion of visitors typically proceed to the product pages, creating further constriction of the metaphorical funnel. Each step the visitor takes further reduces the number of visitors, typically by 30%–80% per page.

Adding the product to the shopping cart, registering or filling in contact details and payment all further reduce the numbers step-by-step cumulatively along the funnel. The more steps, the fewer visitors get through to becoming paying customers. For this reason, sites with similar pricing and products can have hugely different conversion rates of visitors to customers and therefore greatly differing profits.

== See also ==
- Big data
- Behavioral analytics
- Analytics
- Mobile app
