= Lindner Hotels & Resorts =

Hotel company

The Lindner Hotels & Resorts is a family-owned hotel company with headquarters in Düsseldorf. They have 32 hotels with 4,760 rooms and employs 2,000 people. At the end of 2010, the hotel group made a turnover of € 165.7 million.
