= Human resources information systems =

Software for personnel management

Human resource information systems (HRIS) are software designed to help businesses meet core HR needs and improve the productivity of management and employees. HRIS is used to manage human resources in a more structured way. Human resource management needs timely and reliable information on the present and potential workforce in order to acquire a competitive advantage in the marketplace. HRIS and technological innovation have made it much easier to meet this information demand. HRIS is also hardware, support functions, policies, and systematic procedures that support the strategic and operational processes of HR departments into automated processes. It involves databases and computer programs that are utilized in HRIS implementation to store, manages, record, deliver, and manipulate data for a variety of human resource operations.

The purpose of HRIS is to process and provide timely and accurate employee information. By doing so, HR professionals are free to perform more high-value work. The time needed to work on these activities will be more cost-effective and efficient and have a strong effect on the effectiveness of the organization. Previous studies found a variety of benefits as a result of the implementation of HRIS for the organization. HRIS has been predicted to positively affect time efficiency because by implementing HRIS in the organization, employees can input more data accurately and efficiently. HRIS has developed with information technologies as a human resource management (HRM) function. With the role of an HR professional transforming from a traditional administrative to a more strategic role, HRIS helped maintain, manage, and process detailed employee information and human-resources–related policies and procedures.

== Functions ==
HRIS enables businesses to use technology more effectively in a variety of operations. It also consists of people, forms, policies, procedures, and data in addition to hardware and software. Organizations can benefit from modern HRIS by automating the majority of HR planning tasks. Since HRIS collects, maintains, and delivers information for decision-making, it becomes a crucial strategic instrument.

== See also ==
- human resource for health information system (HRHIS)
