= Process analysis =

Form of technical writing and expository writing

Process analysis is a form of technical writing and expository writing "designed to convey to the reader how a change takes place through a series of stages".

While the traditional process analysis and a set of instructions are both organized chronologically, the reader of a process analysis is typically interested in understanding the chronological components of a system that operates largely without the reader's direct actions (such as how the body digests an apple), while the reader of a set of instructions intends to use the instructions in order to accomplish a specific, limited task (such as how to bake an apple pie). By contrast, the reader of a mechanism description is more interested in an object in space (such as the form and nutritional value of a particular kind of apple).

== See also ==
- Process mining
