= Data reporting =

Process of data recollection

Data reporting is the process of collecting and submitting data.

The effective management of any organization relies on accurate data. Inaccurate data reporting can lead to poor decision-making based on erroneous evidence. Data reporting is different from data analysis which transforms data and information into insights. Data reporting is the previous step that translates raw data into information. When data is not reported, the problem is known as underreporting; the opposite problem leads to false positives.

Data reporting can be difficult. Census bureaus may hire perhaps hundreds of thousands of workers to achieve the task of counting all of the residents of a country. Teachers use data from student assessments to determine grades; manufacturers rely on sales data from retailers to indicate which products should have increased production, and which should be curtailed or discontinued.

== Relation to technical reporting ==
Data reporting is often a component of broader technical or scientific reporting processes. Technical reports describe research activities, progress, or results and frequently include sections dedicated to data reporting to present raw or aggregated data that support findings. Unlike peer-reviewed publications, technical reports may not undergo extensive independent review and are often distributed internally within organizations or as grey literature.

Data reporting in these contexts serves to communicate essential data in a structured format, enabling stakeholders to understand the evidence behind conclusions. Unique identifiers such as report numbers or digital object identifiers (DOIs) may be assigned for tracking and citation. The presentation of data generally follows organizational or industry-specific standards, including guidelines on formatting, referencing, and use of visual or tabular data.

== See also ==
- Data processing
- Operational reporting
