= Ad text optimization =

Ad text optimization (ATO) is an element of search engine optimization which aims to improve the performance of a pay-per-click (PPC) text advertisement by improving its click-through rate performance. The process operates both in terms of volume, and quality of response; that is, "more buyers, less browsers".

According to Search Engine Journal, "AdWords text ads are small and in some ways unassuming – when you think about testing landing pages it's obvious that there are elements that could make a big impact, but it's sometimes less intuitive that ad text tests can and often do have an equally big impact on results."

== Work method ==
PPC ads are triggered to appear on search engine pages when users search with keywords which match those selected by the PPC advertiser. When PPC ads are clicked on, they take the user to a designated page on the advertiser's website and a fee is paid to the search engine for the click. Ad text optimization uses a specialist type of direct response copywriting which can be augmented by an ATO algorithm that measures the response effectiveness of the ad copy. For users, the benefit of ATO is to make PPC ads more relevant to their searches. For advertisers, ATO delivers more clicks, leading to more sales and increased return on investment, and search engines benefit by offering their users more efficient search experiences.

== ATO and Quality Score ==
Many search engines, Google being the most notable example, reward more efficient PPC ads with higher Quality Scores, which are measured by higher CTRs. The higher the Quality Score of a PPC ad, the lower the bid price the advertiser has to pay each time a user clicks on the relevant keywords that trigger the PPC ad appearing. Higher Quality Scores combined with CPC bids equal high Ad Rank (Ad Rank = CPC Bid * Quality Score), which result in PPC ads appearing higher up in the user's search results. As ATO is a factor that can increase Quality Score, ad text "plays a crucial role in determining the success of" text-based advertising.

== ATO and SEO ==
ATO in PPC advertising is viewed by many in marketing as the equivalent of search engine optimization for natural search in that they both improve the visibility of websites.

== ATO and Advertising ==
In UK, paid search advertising has become a significant of the digital adverting market. According to IAB UK, search adverting expenditure reached £17.9 billion in 2025, accounting for 44% of total global adverting expenditure.

According to the UK's Internet Advertising Bureau, search is now a significant advertising medium in its own right with the paid search market worth almost £2.15 billion in 2009 representing 60.7% of online advertising spend in the UK. PPC Ads make up a large portion of this market.
