= Enterprise optimization =

Enterprise Optimization (EO) is "a systematic process of planning, integrating, coordinating and executing all dimensions of enterprise activities for best-possible mission-focused results". It is a sub-field of management science. The purpose of EO is to answer the basic question "What do we need to do to earn best-possible profits under continually changing market conditions?" As a practical field of management Enterprise Optimization is both a science and an art.

Linear programming (LP), originally developed and commonly used for optimal allocation of scarce resources, is the primary mathematical tool of Enterprise Optimization.

== Concepts ==
Enterprise Optimization defines 5 types of resources: Capital, Procurement options, Sales opportunities, Production capabilities, and Information. EO can be thought of as the optimization of the procurement and the use of these resources.

Opportunity Values (OVs) are a by-product of Linear programming. Positive OVs show how much bottom-line profit gain will come with each constraint relief. For controllable variables with negative OVs, this value shows how much any profit-forfeiting activities are costing. In the field of Operations research Opportunity values are called Shadow prices or sometimes Marginal values.

Field of opportunities (sometimes also called Profit Gap) is another concept of Enterprise Optimization. Field of opportunities is defined as the distance between the best-possible level of enterprise performance and the current performance.

== History ==
The first known application of Linear Programming for the purposes of enterprise optimization was a computerized LP system for an Oregon forest products company in 1967. The term "Enterprise Optimization" is attributed to Eugene L, Bryan, PhD in 1970.

== Applications ==
Enterprise Optimization has been applied in the forest, plywood, and sawmill industries since 1970s. It has also been applied in the food , steel , and other manufacturing industries.
