= Operational reporting =

In data processing, operational reporting is reporting about operational details that reflects current activity. Operational reporting is intended to support the day-to-day activities of the organization. Examples of operational reporting include bank teller end-of-day window balancing reports, daily account audits and adjustments, daily production records, flight-by-flight traveler logs and transaction logs.

Most operational reports do not require time-consuming steps. Most are produced automatically on a regular schedule, or may be available on request.

Operational reporting is intended to provide a granular, real-time, view of the immediate situation. This is distinct from analytical reporting, which is used for longer-term, predictive use-cases. Operational reporting is repetitive, done frequently, and typically involves numerous simple manual steps.

== See also ==
- Business reporting
- List of reporting software
- Reporting (disambiguation)
