= Customer dynamics =

Theory on customer-business relationships

Customer dynamics is an emerging theory on customer-business relationships that describes the ongoing interchange of information and transactions between customers and organizations. These exchanges occur over a wide range of communication channels, such as phone, email, Web and text, including those outside of organizational control like social media. Similar to the scientific disciplines of family and social dynamics, Customer Dynamics looks at the relationships between organizations and customers from an interpersonal viewpoint. It goes beyond the transactional nature of the interaction to look at emotions, intent, and desires. It views interactions as a chain of events rather than single point occurrences.

Customer dynamics is a subset of organizational dynamics, which describes how people function together to accomplish a task. The level of operational success is said to be determined by the behavioral nature of organizations—individuals' roles, interpersonal relations, and group dynamics, and how they all react when brought together.

Customer dynamics is a specific dimension of customer experience management and customer relationship management. It is distinct from these disciplines in its focus on the actual interactions that occur between the customer and the organization, and its consideration of implications for both the customer and the business.

According to 2009 benchmark research of global contact center leaders by NICE Systems and Ventana Research, 44% of respondents expect increases in the volume of customer interactions. Initially driven by consumer concerns regarding the economy, investment performance and mortgage refinancing for example, the availability and maturation of alternate communication channels, such as instant and text messaging and Web self-service, are seen as long-term drivers of this growth. This expected increase in interaction volumes places additional importance on increasing operational efficiency without sacrificing customer service.

Customer dynamics addresses how the growing volume and diversity of interactions impacts the customer-business relationship in the areas of operational efficiency, customer experience, and revenue generation. The theory suggests that businesses can create significant competitive differentiation by understanding the customer’s true intent and meeting that in a way that also supports the business’s intents.

== See also ==
- Customer experience
- Customer service
- Customer relationship management
- Speech analytics
