= International Conference on Business Process Management =

- Abbreviation: BPM conference
- Discipline: Computer science

Publication details
- Publisher: Springer LNCS
- History: 2003–
- Frequency: annual (since 2003)

The International Conference on Business Process Management is an academic conference organized annually by the BPM community. The conference was first organized in 2003 Eindhoven, Netherlands. Since then the conference has been organized annually. The conference is the premium forum for researchers, practitioners and developers in the field of Business Process Management (BPM). The conference typically attracts over 300 participants from all over the world.

The BPM Steering Committee is responsible for the conference, including selection of organizers, invited speakers, workshops, etc.

== Topics ==
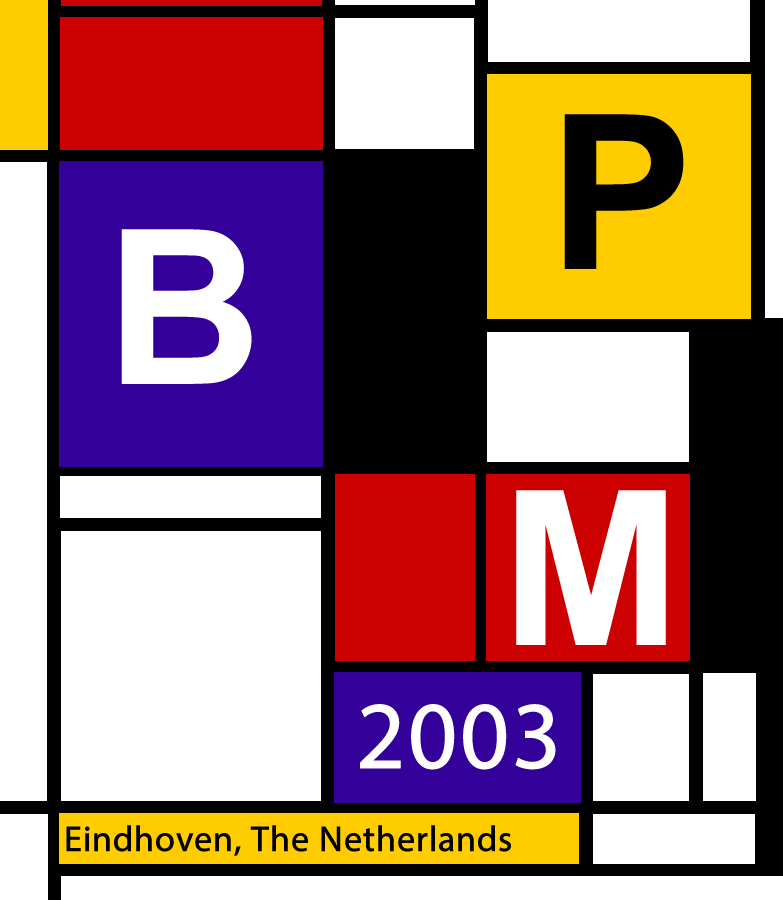
BPM 2003 logo.

Topics covered by the conference include:

- Business process modeling
- BPM/WFM systems
- Process mining
- Business process intelligence
- Workflow automation
- Process change management
- Reference process models
- Process modeling languages
- Case management
- Process variability and configuration
- Operations research for business processes
- Collaborative business process management
- Qualitative and quantitative process analysis (e.g. process simulation)
- Management aspects of BPM
- Decision management
- Process discovery
- Process compliance
- Process innovation
- Process execution architectures

== History ==
The first conference was organized by Wil van der Aalst and was held in conjunction with the 24th International Conference on Applications and Theory of Petri Nets in Eindhoven. Since BPM 2005 in Nancy, the conference has co-located workshops in different subfields of BPM.

- BPM 2023 in Utrecht, Netherlands
  - General Chair: Hajo Reijers
  - PC Co-Chairs: Shazia Sadiq, Chiara Di Francescomarino, Andrea Burattin, Christian Janiesch
  - Workshop Chairs: Luise Pufahl, Jochen De Weerdt
- BPM 2022 in Münster, Germany
  - PC Co-Chairs: Adela del Río Ortega, Claudio Di Ciccio, Remco Dijkman, Stefanie Rinderle-Ma
  - General Chair: Jörg Becker
  - Workshop Chairs: Cristina Cabanillas, Agnes Koschmider, Niels Frederik Garmann-Johnsen
- BPM 2021 in Rome, Italy
  - PC Co-Chairs: Artem Polyvyanyy, Moe Thandar Wynn, Amy Van Looy, Manfred Reichert
  - General Chair: Massimo Mecella
  - Workshop Chairs: Andrea Marrella, Barbara Weber
- BPM 2020 in Sevilla, Spain
  - PC Co-Chairs: Dirk Fahland, Chiara Ghidini, Jörg Becker, Marlon Dumas
  - General Chair: Manuel Resinas, Antonio Ruiz-Cortés
  - Workshop Chairs: Adela del-Río-Ortega, Henrik Leopold, Flavia M. Santoro
- BPM 2019 in Vienna, Austria
  - PC Co-Chairs: Thomas Hildebrandt, Boudewijn van Dongen, Maximilian Röglinger, Jan Mendling
  - General Chair: Jan Mendling, Stefanie Rinderle-Ma
  - Workshop Chairs: Remco Dijkman, Chiara di Francescomarino, Uwe Zdun
- BPM 2018 in Sydney, Australia
  - PC Co-Chairs: Mathias Weske, Marco Montali, Ingo Weber, Jan vom Brocke
  - General Chair: Boualem Benatallah and Jian Yang
  - Workshop Chairs: Florian Daniel, Hamid Motahari, Michael Sheng
- BPM 2017 in Barcelona, Spain
  - PC Co-Chairs: Josep Carmona, Gregor Engels, Akhil Kumar
  - General Chair: Josep Carmona
  - Workshop Chairs: Matthias Weidlich, Ernest Teniente
- BPM 2016 in Rio de Janeiro, Brazil
  - PC Co-Chairs: Marcello La Rosa, Peter Loos, Oscar Pastor
  - General Chair: Flávia Santoro
  - Workshop Chairs: Marlon Dumas, Marcelo Fantinato
- BPM 2015 in Innsbruck, Austria
  - PC Co-Chairs: Hamid Reza Motahari-Nezhad, Jan Recker, Matthias Weidlich
  - General Chair: Barbara Weber
- BPM 2014 in Eindhoven, Netherlands (relocated from Haifa, Israel)
  - PC Co-Chairs: Shazia Sadiq, Pnina Soffer, Hagen Völzer
  - General Co-Chairs: Avigdor Gal, Mor Peleg
  - Local Chair: Wil van der Aalst
- BPM 2013 in Beijing, China
  - PC Co-Chairs: Florian Daniel, Jianmin Wang, Barbara Weber
  - General Chair: Jianmin Wang
- BPM 2012 in Tallinn, Estonia
  - PC Co-Chairs: Alistair Barros, Avi Gal, Ekkart Kindler
  - General Chair: Marlon Dumas
- BPM 2011 in Clermont-Ferrand, France
  - PC Co-Chairs: Stefanie Rinderle-Ma, Farouk Toumani, Karsten Wolf
  - General Chair: Farouk Toumani, Mohand-Said Hacid
- BPM 2010 in Hoboken (NJ), United States
  - PC Co-Chairs: Richard Hull, Jan Mendling, Stefan Tai
  - General Chair: Michael zur Mühlen
- BPM 2009 in Ulm, Germany
  - PC Co-Chairs: Umeshwar Dayal, Johann Eder, Hajo A. Reijers
  - General Chairs: Peter Dadam, Manfred Reichert
- BPM 2008 in Milan, Italy
  - PC Co-Chairs: Marlon Dumas, Manfred Reichert, Ming-Chien Shan
  - General Chair: Barbara Pernici
- BPM 2007 in Brisbane, Australia
  - PC Co-Chairs: Gustavo Alonso, Peter Dadam, Michael Rosemann
  - General Chairs: Marlon Dumas, Michael Rosemann
- BPM 2006 in Vienna, Austria
  - PC Co-Chairs: Schahram Dustdar, José Luiz Fiadeiro, Amit P. Sheth
  - General Chair: Schahram Dustdar
- BPM 2005 in Nancy, France
  - PC Co-Chairs: Wil M. P. van der Aalst, Boualem Benatallah, Fabio Casati
  - General Chair: Claude Godart
- BPM 2004 in Potsdam, Germany
  - PC Co-Chairs: Jörg Desel, Barbara Pernici, Mathias Weske
  - General Chair: Mathias Weske
- BPM 2003 in Eindhoven, Netherlands
  - PC Co-Chairs: Wil van der Aalst, Arthur H. M. ter Hofstede, Mathias Weske
  - General Chair: Wil van der Aalst

== See also ==
- The list of computer science conferences contains other academic conferences in computer science.
- The topics of the conference cover the field of computer science.
- Process mining is a process management technique that allows for the analysis of business processes based on event logs.
- Business Process Management (BPM) includes methods, techniques, and tools to support the design, enactment, management, and analysis of operational business processes. It can be considered as an extension of classical Workflow Management (WFM) systems and approaches.
