= Michael Rosemann =

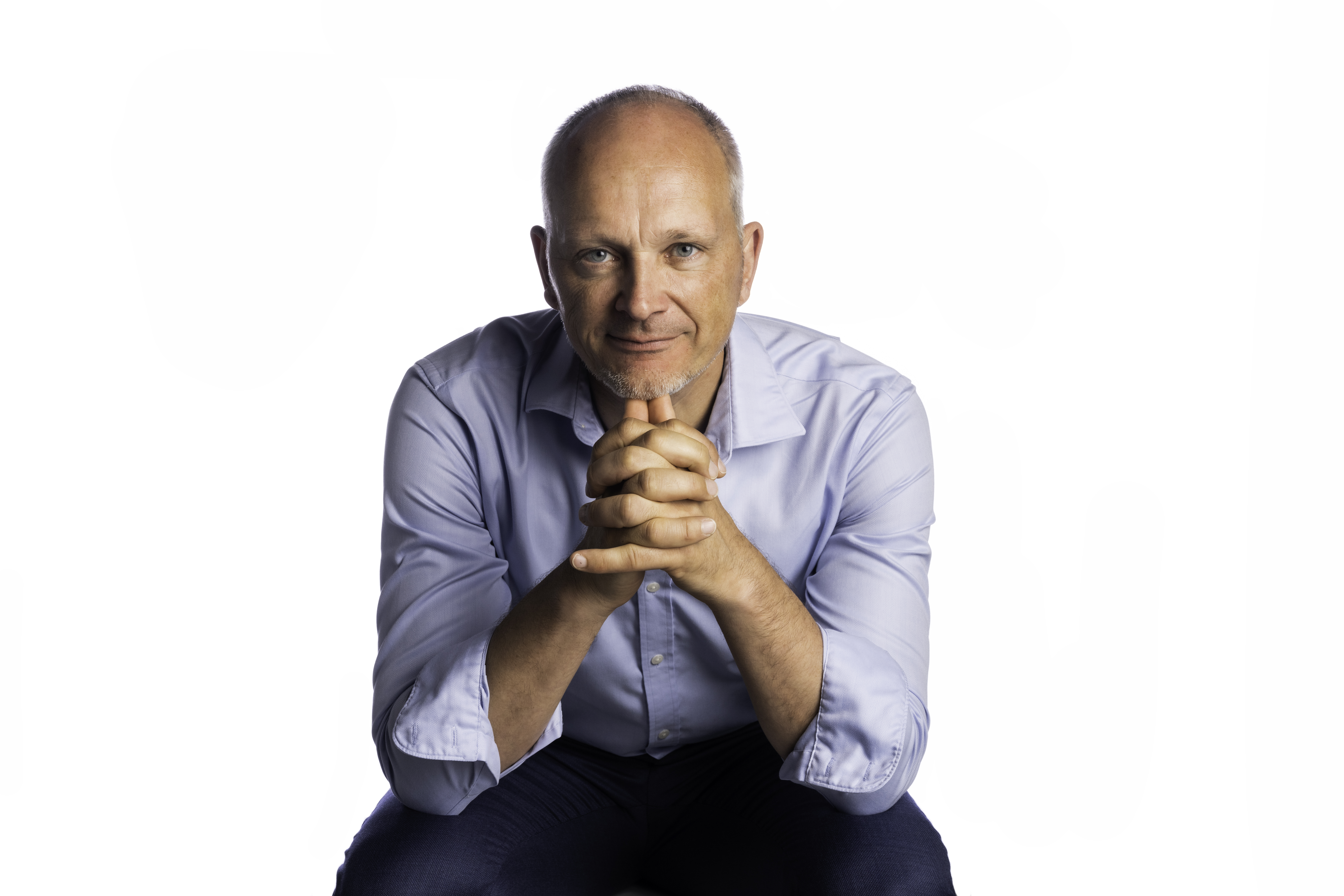
- Born: 7 October 1967 (age 59)
- Known for: Business Process Management, Innovation Systems, Trust, Revenue Resilience, Higher Education
- Scientific career
- Fields: Information systems, Business Process Management, Innovation systems
- Workplaces: Queensland University of Technology, University of Münster
- Thesis: Complexity Management of Process Models (1992)
- Website: www.michaelrosemann.com

Michael Rosemann (born 7 October 1967) is a German-Australian information systems researcher and professor at the Queensland University of Technology, Brisbane, Australia. He is currently the director of the Centre for Future Enterprise at QUT. His research interests include revenue resilience, business process management, trust management and innovation systems. Rosemann is also the honorary consul of the Federal Republic of Germany in Southern Queensland.

== Biography ==
Born in Bremen, Germany, Rosemann received a master's degree in Business Administration and a PhD in Information Systems (1995) from the Westphalian-Wilhelms University Muenster. In 1992 he started working at the Westphalian-Wilhelms University Muenster in the Department of Information Systems. In 1993, he co-authored his first book with Joerg Becker called 'Logistics and CIM'. During his time in Muenster, Rosemann conducted research in the areas of reference modelling, the quality of conceptual models, process monitoring and large-scale enterprise systems management. He taught in the areas of information systems, operations management and logistics.

In 1999, Rosemann started as a senior lecturer at the Queensland University of Technology (QUT), where he was promoted to associate professor (2001) and professor (2004). He was the head of QUT's Information Systems School from 2010 to 2016 and executive director, corporate engagement, in 2017–2018. Since 1 January 2019, he is a professor in QUT's School of Management. He became the Director of QUT's Centre for Future Enterprise in January 2020.

Rosemann spent sabbaticals at Babson College, USA, (with Tom Davenport) and the Technical University of Eindhoven, the Netherlands (with Wil van der Aalst).

In 2007, he was the chair of the first International Conference on Business Process Management (BPM 2007) outside Europe. He also was the co-chair of the Austral-Asian Conference on Information Systems (ACIS) in 2010 and program co-chair of the International Conference on Information Systems (ICIS) in December 2018. He was the coordination chair of the International Conference on Business Process Management in 2024 and one of the three organising chairs of the International Conference on Information Systems (ICIS) in Lisbon, Portugal in 2026.

Rosemann is a Fellow of the Queensland Academy of Arts and Sciences and a Fellow of the Australian Computer Society. He is also the Vice President of Strategic Partnerships for the Association of Information Systems.

Rosemann became the honorary consul of the Federal Republic of Germany in Southern Queensland in May 2016. Rosemann's home town of Weyhe honored his role with an entry into the 'Golden Book' of Weyhe in July 2017. As the honorary consul he initiated and is responsible for the Brisbane German Week.

In April 2020, he coordinated two repatriation flights from Brisbane to Germany triggered by the COVID pandemic. Rosemann is the Patron of the Brisbane German Club.

== Work ==
Rosemann's research is in the fields of business process management, revenue resilience, trust management and innovation systems.

His main contributions are the concept of a series of process innovation patterns, seven traits of a digital mind, a revenue resilience assessment, value-driven BPM, the rapid redesign method NESTT, customer process management, a BPM maturity model, guidelines of business process modelling, configurable reference models, ambidextrous BPM, context-aware BPM, trust-aware process design, affective process design and AI-enabled process nudges.

Michael's PhD students have won the Australian award for the best PhD thesis in Information Systems in 2007, 2008 and 2010.

In November 2011, he was interviewed as part of Gartner's Fellow Interview series. His paper on 'Toward improving the relevance of information systems research to proactive: the role of applicability checks', published in the MIS Quarterly (2008) and co-authored with Iris Vessey, won the Emerald Management Reviews Citations of Excellence Awards for 2012. Rosemann has been the co-author of conference papers that won the best paper award at CAiSE 1999 (Heidelberg). PACIS 2004 (Shanghai), ACIS 2005 (Manly) and BPM 2010 (New York). His paper on trust aware process design was the best paper in the BPM 2019 management track of the conference (Vienna).

Rosemann conducted invited keynote presentations at a number of prestigious global academic conferences including the International Conference on Business Process Management (BPM2008, Milan, Italy), the International Conference on Conceptual Modelling (ER2015, Stockholm, Sweden) and the International Conference on Advanced Information Systems Engineering (CAiSE2021, Melbourne, Australia).

== Publications ==
Rosemann has published in total more than 350 books, journal papers, book chapters, conference papers, and reports on these topics. Some of his books are available in English, German, Mandarin, Russian and Portuguese. Among others, he co-authored the book ‘The New Learning Economy: Thriving Beyond Higher Education’ with Martin Betts (Routledge, 2023) and edited the comprehensive International Handbook on Business Process Management with Jan vom Brocke (2nd edition, Springer 2015). His papers have appeared in leading academic journals including MIS Quarterly, the European Journal of Information Systems, the Journal of the Association of Information Systems and the Journal of Strategic Information Systems.

Books, a selection:

- Betts, M., and M. Rosemann: The New Learning Economy. Routledge 2022.
- Vom Brocke, J, and M. Rosemann (editors). Handbook of Business Process Management. 2nd edition, two volumes. Springer 2014.
- Becker, J., Kugeler, M., and M. Rosemann (editors). Process management (in German). 7th edition. Springer 2012.
- Green, P., and M.Rosemann. Business Systems Analysis with Ontologies. Idea Group 2005.

Articles, a selection:

- Rosemann, M.Proposals for Future BPM Research Directions. In: Proceedings of the 2nd Asia Pacific Business Process Management Conference, Brisbane, 3–4 July 2014, pp. 1– 15.
- Recker, J., Safrudin, N., Rosemann, M. (2012): How Novices Design Business Processes. In: Information Systems, Vol 37, No. 6, pp. 557–573.
- Recker, J., Rosemann, M., Green, P., and M. Indulska (2011): "Do ontological deficiencies in modeling grammars matter?" In: MIS Quarterly 35 (1), pp. 57–79.
- Rosemann, M., and I. Vessey (2008). "Toward improving the relevance of information systems research to practive: the role of applicability checks". MIS Quarterly 32 (1): pp. 1–22.
- Rosemann, M., and W.MP van der Aalst (2007). "A configurable reference modeling language". In: Information Systems 32 (1): pp. 1–23.
- Rosemann, M., and P. Green (2002). "Developing a meta model for the Bunge-Wand-Weber ontological constructs". In: Information Systems 27 (2), pp. 75–91.
- Klaus, H., Rosemann, M., and G. G Gable (2000). "What is ERP". In: Information Systems Frontiers 2 (2):pp. 141–162.
