= Rosemann =

Rosemann is a surname. Notable people with the surname include:

- Rosemann of Isenburg-Kempenich, Lord of Isenburg-Kempenich co-ruling with his brothers Salentin and Theodoric II, and eventually his nephew Theodoric III
- Julius Rosemann (1878–1933), German politician of the Independent Social Democratic Party
- Martin Rosemann (born 1976), German politician
- Michael Rosemann (born 1967), German information systems researcher, professor and Director of the Centre for Future Enterprise, QUT, Brisbane, Australia, Australia
- Philipp Rosemann (born 1964), German philosopher and Professor and Chair of Philosophy at Maynooth University

== See also ==
- Roseman
- Rosman (disambiguation)
