= Arthur ter Hofstede =

Dutch computer scientist

Arthur Harry Maria ter Hofstede (born 1966) is a Dutch computer scientist, and professor of information systems at the Queensland University of Technology in Australia, and professor at the Eindhoven University of Technology, known for his work in workflow patterns, YAWL, and business process management.

== Biography ==
Born in Nijmegen, Hofstede received his MA in computer science in 1989 at the Radboud University Nijmegen, and his PhD in computer science in 1993 with a thesis entitled "Information modelling in data intensive domains" under supervision of Eckhard D. Falkenberg.

Hofstede had started his academic career in 1989 as researcher in the Software Engineering Research Centre of the Radboud University Nijmegen, where he published his first technical reports in cooperation with Sjaak Brinkkemper, Patrick van Bommel, Erik Proper and others. In 1993 he was appointed associate professor at the Radboud University Nijmegen. In 1996 he started in Australia as a lecturer at the University of Queensland. In 1997 he switched to the Queensland University of Technology where he became senior lecturer in 1998, associate professor in 2000, and professor in 2008 in the faculty of science and engineering. In 2010 he is also appointed part-time professor at the Eindhoven University of Technology in the information systems group.

== Publications ==
Hofstede has authored and co-authored numerous publications in the field of business process management, workflow, and e-services. Books, a selection:

- Arthur ter Hofstede. Information modelling in data intensive domains. Doctoral thesis Department of Informatics, Faculty of Science, University of Nijmegen, 1993
- Wil van Der Aalst, Arthur ter Hofstede, and Mathias Weske. Business process management: A survey. With Springer Berlin Heidelberg, 2003.
- Marlon Dumas, Wil M. Van der Aalst and Arthur ter Hofstede (eds.) Process-aware information systems: bridging people and software through process technology. With . Wiley-Interscience, 2005.

Articles, a selection:

- van Der Aalst, W. M., Ter Hofstede, A. H., Kiepuszewski, B., & Barros, A. P. (2003). Workflow patterns. Distributed and parallel databases, 14(1), 5-51.
- Van Der Aalst, Wil MP, and Arthur HM Ter Hofstede. "YAWL: yet another workflow language." Information systems 30.4 (2005): 245–275.
- Russell, Nick, Arthur HM Ter Hofstede, and Nataliya Mulyar. "Workflow controlflow patterns: A revised view." (2006).
