= Zijm =

Zijm is a Dutch patronymic surname mostly limited to the island of Texel, where Zijm (Sijm) was a short form of Simon. It can refer to:

- Henk Zijm (born 1952), Dutch mathematician
- Sieme Zijm (born 1978), Dutch footballer
