= Eric van Damme =

Dutch economist

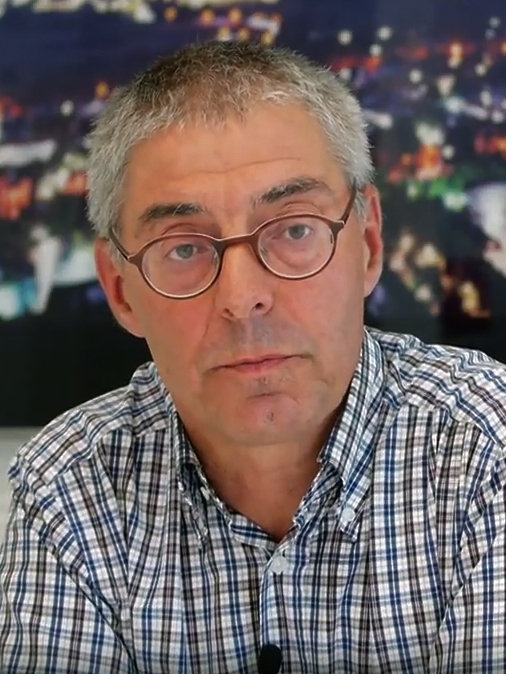
- Eric van Damme (2014)
- Born: Eric Eleterius Coralie van Damme; 27 July 1956 (age 70); Terneuzen, Netherlands

Academic background
- Education: Radboud University Nijmegen; Eindhoven University of Technology
- Thesis: Refinements of the Nash Equilibrium Concept (1983)
- Doctoral advisor: Jaap Wessels; Reinhard Selten
- Other advisor: Stef Tijs

Eric Eleterius Coralie van Damme (born 27 July 1956) is a Dutch economist and professor emeritus at Tilburg University, known for his contributions to game theory.

== Biography ==
Born in Terneuzen, Van Damme received his MA in Mathematics at the Radboud University Nijmegen in 1979, where he was mentored by Stef Tijs, who is regarded as the godfather of game theory in the Netherlands. He went on to earn his PhD in Technical Sciences in 1983 at the Eindhoven University of Technology with a thesis entitled "Refinements of the Nash Equilibrium Concept" under supervision of Jaap Wessels and Reinhard Selten.

After graduation Van Damme started his academic career in 1983 as Assistant Professor at the Delft University of Technology, and got promoted to Associate Professor in 1984. In 1986 he moved to the University of Bonn, where he was Associate Professor in Economic Theory until 1990. In 1989 he got appointed Professor of Economics at the Tilburg University Since then he has held several administrative positions at the CentER, the Center for Economic Research at the Tilburg University. In between he was Visiting Professor at European Universities in Bielefeld, Copenhagen, Stockholm, Helsinki, Vienna, Lisbon; and in the USA at the Kellogg School of Management. He is also member of multiple editorial boards.

== Honors and awards ==
Van Damme was elected fellow of the Econometric Society in 1993, and appointed member of the Royal Netherlands Academy of Arts and Sciences in 2004. He is also a fellow of the European Economic Association. In 2009 he awarded a knighthood in the Order of the Netherlands Lion.

== Work ==
Van Damme's research interests are in the fields of "game theory, economic theory, competition policy and regulation, experimental economics, bounded rationality and bargaining."

== Publications ==
Van Damme has authored and co-authored numerous publications specifically in the field of game theory. Books, a selection:

- 1983. Refinements of the Nash equilibrium concept. Springer Verlag, Berlin
- 1987. Stability and Perfection of Nash Equilibria. Springer Verlag, Berlin
- 1996. Understanding Strategic Interaction; Essays in Honor of Reinhard Selten Et al. (eds.). Springer Verlag, Berlin

Articles, a selection:

- Van Damme, Eric. "Stable equilibria and forward induction." Journal of Economic Theory 48.2 (1989): 476–496.
- Carlsson, Hans, and Eric Van Damme. "Global games and equilibrium selection." Econometrica (1993): 989–1018.
- Güth, Werner, and Eric Van Damme. "Information, strategic behavior, and fairness in ultimatum bargaining: An experimental study." Journal of Mathematical Psychology 42.2 (1998): 227–247.
