= Anne van den Nouweland =

Dutch-American game theorist

Anne van den Nouweland is a Dutch-American game theorist specializing in cooperative game theory, the game-based formation of complex networks, and their application in the design of communication networks. She works as a professor of economics at the University of Oregon.

== Education and career ==
Van den Nouweland studied mathematics as an undergraduate at Nijmegen University in the Netherlands, graduating in 1984, and earned a master's degree there in 1989. Her master's thesis research applied intuitionism to the understanding of the Riemann–Stieltjes integral, supervised by Arnoud van Rooij and Wim Veldman. After two more years as a teaching assistant in the mathematics department at Nijmegen, she moved to the econometrics department at Tilburg University, also in the Netherlands, completing her Ph.D. there in 1993. Her doctoral dissertation, Games and Graphs in Economic Situations, was promoted by Stef Tijs.

After completing her doctorate, she stayed on at Tilburg as an assistant professor and member of the CentER for Economic Research. She moved to the University of Oregon in 1996, was tenured there as an associate professor in 2001, and was promoted to full professor in 2007.

== Book ==
Van den Nouweland is the coauthor of Social and Economic Networks in Cooperative Game Theory (with Marco Slikker, Kluwer Academic Publishers, 2001).
