= Nelly Litvak =

Russian and Dutch applied mathematician

Nelly Vladimirovna Litvak (Russian: Нелли Владимировна Литвак, born January 27, 1972) is a Russian and Dutch applied mathematician whose research includes the study of complex networks, stochastic processes, and their applications in medical logistics. Formerly a professor at the University of Twente, she moved to the Eindhoven University of Technology in 2023.

== Education and career ==
Nelly Litvak was born in Gorky (now Nizhny Novgorod), Russia to the journalist Nina Zvereva and the researcher Vladimir Antonets. In 1995 Litvak graduated from the N. I. Lobachevsky State University of Nizhny Novgorod, and in 1998 she earned the candidate's degree in physical and mathematical sciences from the latter university with the dissertation Adaptive Control of Conflicting Flows supervised by Mikhail Andreevich Fedotkin. In 1999 she moved to the Netherlands. She completed another doctoral degree in 2002, a Ph.D. from the Eindhoven University of Technology, with the dissertation Collecting $n$ Items Randomly Located on a Circle, completed in EURANDOM, jointly promoted by Ivo Adan, Jaap Wessels, and Henk Zijm.

She became a lecturer at the University of Twente in 2002, and was promoted to associate professor in 2011 and full professor in 2018. In 2017, she took on a second part-time affiliation with the Eindhoven University of Technology, and in 2023 she moved from Twente to a full-time position at the Eindhoven University of Technology, as professor of algorithms for complex networks.

== Books ==
Litvak is the author of several popular science books, including:

- Наши хорошие подростки (Our good teenagers, in Russian, Alpina, 2010)
- Формула призвания – 7 правил выбора вуза (Vocation formula – 7 rules for choosing university, Alpina, 2012)
- IQ to Love: What makes highly intelligent men attractive to women (self-published, 2014)
- Кому нужна математика? Понятная книга о том, как устроен цифровой мир (Who Needs Mathematics? A Clear Book about how the Digital World Works, with Andrey Raygorodsky, in Russian, Mann-Ivanov-Ferber («Манн, Иванов и Фербер»), 2017)
  - The book was shortlisted for the Russian 2017 Enlightener Prize.
- Математика для безнадежных гуманитариев (Mathematics for hopeless humanities geeks, with Alla Kechedzhan, in Russian, AST, 2019)

== Recognition ==
Litvak was awarded the 2002 Stieltjes Prize for her Ph.D. dissertation. She was the 2011 recipient of the Professor De Winter award of the University of Twente, given annually to recognize the research of a female faculty member. She was named the university's teacher of the year in 2022.

== Personal ==
While in the Netherlands, Nelly Litvak married to Pranab Mandal. She has two daughters: Natalia (born in 1993 from the first marriage) and Piyali (born in 2005 to Nelly and Pranab). She has younger sister Yekaterina and brother Pyotr.
