= Mathias Weske =

German computer scientist

Mathias Weske (born 1963) is a German computer scientist, and Professor of Business Process Technology at the University of Potsdam, known for his contributions in the field of business process management and as a founder of the business Signavio.

Weske received his PhD in 1993 at the University of Koblenz, and his habilitation in 2000 at the University of Münster. In 2000-01 he was associate professor at the Eindhoven University of Technology, and in 2001 he was appointed Professor of Computer Science at the Hasso Plattner Institut of the University of Potsdam teaching computer modeling.

== Publications ==
Weske authored and co-authored numerous publications in the field of Business Process Management and Computer Science. Books, a selection:

- Van Der Aalst, Wil MP, Arthur HM Ter Hofstede, and Mathias Weske. Business process management: A survey. Springer Berlin Heidelberg, 2003.
- Weske, Mathias. Business process management: concepts, languages, architectures. Springer, 2012.

Articles, a selection:

- van der Aalst, Wil MP, and Mathias Weske. "The P2P approach to interorganizational workflows." Advanced Information Systems Engineering. Springer Berlin Heidelberg, 2001.
- Van der Aalst, Wil MP, Mathias Weske, and Dolf Grünbauer. "Case handling: a new paradigm for business process support." Data & Knowledge Engineering 53.2 (2005): 129–162.
- Decker, G., Kopp, O., Leymann, F., & Weske, M. (2007, July). "BPEL4Chor: Extending BPEL for modeling choreographies". In Web Services, 2007. ICWS 2007. IEEE International Conference on (pp. 296–303). IEEE.
