= Kees van Hee =

Dutch computer scientist (born 1946)

Kees Max van Hee (born 1946) is a Dutch computer scientist, and Emeritus Professor at the Eindhoven University of Technology, known for his development of the process modelling tool ExSpecT, and his seminal work on workflow management.

== Biography ==
Van Hee studied Mathematics and Informatics at Eindhoven University of Technology, where in 1978 he received his PhD cum laude with a thesis entitled "Bayesian control of Markov chains", under supervision of Jaap Wessels and Fred W. Steutel.

From 1985 to 2011, Van Hee was Professor of Information Systems at the Faculty for Mathematics and Informatics, Eindhoven University of Technology. He supervised 20 doctoral students, among them Jan L.G. Dietz (1987) and Wil van der Aalst (1992).

He was also research fellow of the Econometric Institute at the Erasmus University Rotterdam.

From 1994 to 2004, Van Hee was also a director at Bakkenist Management Consultants, and after it was incorporated by Deloitte, at Deloitte.

Throughout his career, much of his research, university teaching, and consultancy centered on business process modeling, often with the aid of Petri net-based modeling techniques.

As Dean of the Faculty of Mathematics and Computer science at the Eindhoven University of Technology Van Hee had initiated an own investigation, asking among other Andries Brouwer and Gerard 't Hooft for a second opinion, which led to the cancellation of the PhD graduation of Marcoen Cabbolet in 2008. Afterwards a Committee for Scientific Integrity initially ruled that the Dean of the University and Deans of the Faculties had failed to apply the principle of audi alteram partem in the process, but in the appeal case Van Hee and others were acquitted.

In 2011 Van Hee was appointed Officer of the Order of Orange-Nassau for his exceptional contributions to science and society.

== Publications ==
Books a selection:

- 1978. Bayesian control of Markov chains. Doctoral thesis Eindhoven University of Technology. Amsterdam : Mathematisch Centrum.
- 1993. Systems engineering : a formal approach. Eindhoven : Eindhoven University of Technology.
- 2004. Workflow management: models, methods, and systems. With Wil van der Aalst. The MIT press, 2004.
