= Weyhe =

- Municipality
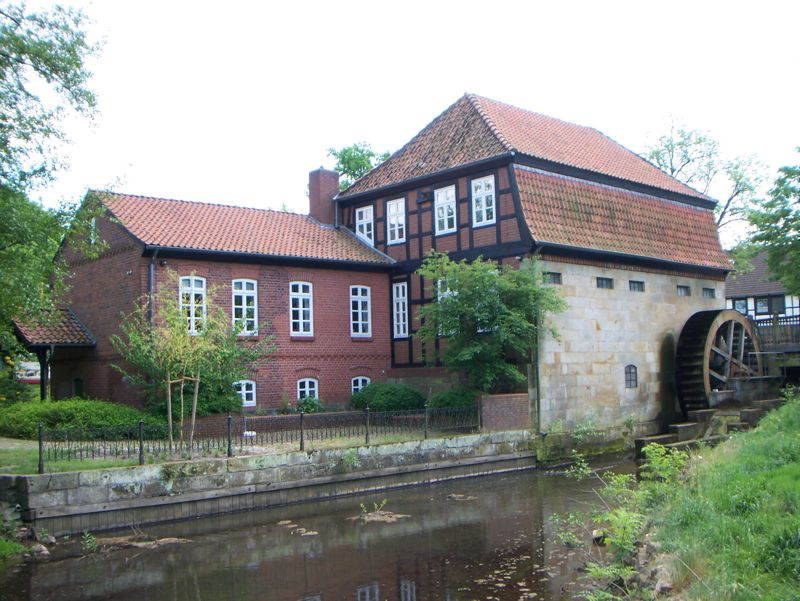
- Water mill

- Coat of arms

- Location of Weyhe within Diepholz district
- Interactive map of Weyhe
- Location within Germany Location within Lower Saxony
- Coordinates: 52°59′37″N 8°52′24″E
- Country: Germany
- State: Lower Saxony
- District: Diepholz
- Subdivisions: 9 districts

Government
  - Mayor (2019–24): Frank Seidel (SPD)

Area
  - Total: 60.36 km^{2} (23.31 sq mi)
- Elevation: 7 m (23 ft)

Population (2025-12-31)
  - Total: 31,004
  - Density: 513.7/km^{2} (1,330/sq mi)
- Time zone: UTC+01:00 (CET)
  - Summer (DST): UTC+02:00 (CEST)
- Postal codes: 28844
- Dialling codes: 04203, 0421
- Vehicle registration: DH
- Website: www.weyhe.de

Weyhe (German pronunciation: [ˈvaɪə]) is a municipality in the district of Diepholz, Lower Saxony, Germany. It is situated approximately 15 km south of Bremen.

== History ==
First mentioned in 860, when a sick girl from "Wege" travelled to the grave of Saint Willehad in Bremen. Legend has it that she was cured by a miracle. However, it was not until 1 March 1974 when the municipally was officially christened as "Weyhe". That day, the nine smaller municipalities Kirchweyhe, Leeste, Lahausen, Sudweyhe, Erichshof, Melchiorshausen, Dreye, Jeebel and Ahausen were united.

== Education ==
In the western part there is the KGS Leeste, in the eastern part the KGS Kirchweyhe. These schools are part of the Gesamtschule (comprehensive school) system which employs all three traditional tracks in German education; Hauptschule, Realschule, and Gymnasium.

== Twin towns – sister cities ==
Weyhe is twinned with:

- Cesvaine, Latvia
- Coulaines, France
- Ērgļi, Latvia
- Lubāna, Latvia
- Madona, Latvia
- Varakļāni, Latvia

== Notable people ==
- Louise Ebert (1873–1955), wife of Friedrich Ebert, the first president of the Weimar Republic
- Katja Riemann (born 1963), actress
- Michael Rosemann (born 1967), professor and Honorary Consul in Brisbane, Australia
- Hermann Rumsfeld, great-great-grandfather of former U.S. Secretary of Defense Donald Rumsfeld
