= Information Systems International Conference =

- Abbreviation: ISICO
- Discipline: Information systems

Publication details
- History: 2011–present

Information Systems International Conference (ISICO) is an AISINDO Indonesia Chapter-affiliated international conference administered by the Department of Information Systems, Institut Teknologi Sepuluh Nopember, Indonesia.

ISICO takes place biannually since 2011. This event brings together information system and information and technology practitioners from around the world to share and discuss their ideas about issues associated with information technology.

ISICO complements existing IS Conferences such as PACIS, AMCIS, ICIS, or ECIS. ISICO 2013 was held in Bali and invited Doug Vogel (Association for Information Systems (AIS) immediate past president) from City University of Hong Kong and Prof. Don Kerr (President of Australasian AIS chapter) from University of the Sunshine Coast. It was attended by 340 participants from 9 countries and established the new AIS Chapter of Indonesia (named: AISINDO).

In 2015, ISICO collaborated with Procedia Computer Science from Elsevier to publish ISICO full papers into the journal.

== History ==
=== 2011 ===
ISICO 2011 was the first international conference to be managed by Information System Department Faculty of Information Technology Institut Teknologi Sepuluh Nopember (ITS). The theme was "Information System for Sustainable Economics Development". ISICO 2011 provided over 10 topics, including Product Knowledge, Information systems, Data Warehouse, Data Mining, Business Intelligence, Business Process Management, Business and Management. This conference was supported by National Taiwan University of Science and Technology (NTUST) Taiwan and Pusan National University.

=== 2013 ===
The second conference was held December 2–4, in Bali. Topics included management, economic, and business; education and curriculum; software engineering and design; artificial intelligence and enterprise systems; information, network and computer security. Keynote speaker were Prof. Dr. Mohammad Nuh, DEA, (Minister of Education and Culture of Indonesia), Prof. Don Kerr (President of Australasian (AIS) and program Leader of Bachelor of Information and Communications Technology, University of the Sunshine Coast, Australia.

=== 2015 ===
ISICO collaborated with Procedia Computer Science (PCS) from Elsevier to publish all ISICO papers. PCS focuses on publishing high quality conference proceedings. It enables fast dissemination so conference delegates can publish their papers in a dedicated online issue on ScienceDirect, which is made freely available worldwide. ISICO's main focus was preparing for the Asia Pacific Free Trade Area opening in 2020. The conference featured Prof. Jae Kyu Lee, PhD, Prof. Dipl.-Ing. Dr. Technology A Min Tjoa, and Prof. Shuo-Yan Chou. ISICO received 230 submissions from 23 countries, mostly from Indonesia, Malaysia, South Korea, Japan, Taiwan and Thailand.

=== 2017 ===
ISICO again collaborated with PCS. It was held in Bali on 6–8 November 2017. The theme was “Innovation of Information Systems – visions, opportunities and challenges“. Keynoters were Matti Rossi, President of The Association for Information Systems 2017/2018; Caroline Chan, President of Australian Council Australian Council of Professors and Heads of Information Systems; and Ahmed Imran, PG IT Program Coordinator, School of Engineering and Information Technology, University of New South Wales, Australia. Topics related to Enterprise System, Information Systems Management, Data Acquisition and Information Dissemination, Data Engineering and Business Intelligence, and IT Infrastructure and Security.
