= Jacques F. Benders =

Dutch mathematician

Jacobus Franciscus (Jacques) Benders (1 June 1924 – 9 January 2017) was a Dutch mathematician and emeritus Professor of Operations Research at the Eindhoven University of Technology. He was the first Professor in the Netherlands in the field of Operations Research and is known for his contributions to mathematical programming.

== Biography ==
Benders studied mathematics at the Utrecht University, where he later also received his PhD in 1960 with the thesis entitled "Partitioning in Mathematical Programming" under supervision of Hans Freudenthal.

Late 1940s had started his career as statistician for the Rubber Foundation. In 1955, he moved to Shell laboratory in Amsterdam, where he researched mathematical programming problems concerning the logistics of oil refinery. He developed the technique known as Benders' decomposition, and used the results in his doctoral thesis.

In 1963, Benders was appointed Professor of Operations Research at the Eindhoven University of Technology, being the first Professor in the Netherlands in that field. Among his PhD students were Israel Herschberg (1966), Jaap Wessels (1968), Freerk Lootsma (1970), Joseph Evers (1973), Jan van Geldrop (1980), Robert van der Vet (1980) Johannes van der Wal (1980), and Jacob Koene (1982). He retired at the Eindhoven University of Technology on May 31, 1989. In 2009 he was awarded the EURO Gold Medal, the highest distinction within Operations Research in Europe.

== Publications ==
Benders has authored and co-authored dozens publications. Books, a selection:

- 1960. Partitioning in mathematical programming. Doctoral thesis Utrecht University.
- 1961. Mathematische programmering: syllabus college Rijksuniversiteit Utrecht 1960–1961
- 1964. De taak van de wiskunde in de operations research. Inaugurele rede.
- 1982. Een decision support systeem voor locatie en allocatieproblemen bij een drankenconcern. With Jo van Nunen.

Articles, a selection:

- Benders, Jacques F. "Partitioning procedures for solving mixed-variables programming problems." Numerische mathematik 4.1 (1962): 238–252.
