= Enterprise information system =

Type of information system

An Enterprise Information System (EIS) is any kind of information system which improves the functions of enterprise business processes through integration. This means typically offering high quality service, dealing with large volumes of data and capable of supporting some large and possibly complex organization or enterprise. An EIS must be able to be used by all parts and all levels of an enterprise.

The word enterprise can have various connotations. Frequently the term is used only to refer to very large organizations such as multi-national companies or public-sector organizations. However, the term may be used to mean virtually anything, by virtue of it having become a corporate-speak buzzword.

== Purpose ==
Enterprise information systems provide a technology platform that enables organizations to integrate and coordinate their business processes on a robust foundation. An EIS is currently used in conjunction with customer relationship management and supply chain management to automate business processes. An enterprise information system provides a single system that is central to the organization that ensuring information can be shared across all functional levels and management hierarchies.

An EIS can be used to increase business productivity and reduce service cycles, product development cycles and marketing life cycles. It may be used to amalgamate existing applications. Other outcomes include higher operational efficiency and cost savings.

Financial value is not usually a direct outcome from the implementation of an enterprise information system.

== Design stage ==
At the design stage the main characteristic of EIS efficiency evaluation is the probability of timely delivery of various messages such as command, service, etc.

== Information systems ==
Enterprise systems create a standard data structure and are invaluable in eliminating the problem of information fragmentation caused by multiple information systems within an organization. An EIS differentiates itself from legacy systems in that it is self-transactional, self-helping and adaptable to general and specialist conditions. Unlike an enterprise information system, legacy systems are limited to department-wide communications.

A typical enterprise information system would be housed in one or more data centers, would run enterprise software, and could include applications that typically cross organizational borders such as content management systems.

== See also ==
- Executive information system
- Management information system
- Enterprise planning systems
- Enterprise software
