= Signavio =

Vendor of BPM software

Signavio GmbH
- Industry: Business process management
- Founded: 2009
- Founders: Gero Decker, Torben Schreiter, Nicolas Peters, Willi Tscheschner, Mathias Weske
- Headquarters: Berlin, Germany
- Products: Signavio business transformation solutions; SAP Signavio Process Manager; SAP Signavio Process Intelligence; SAP Signavio Process Governance
- Services: business transformation; change management; process management
- Owner: SAP (2021-present)
- Website: www.signavio.com

Signavio is a vendor of Business Process Management (BPM) software based in Berlin and Silicon Valley. Its main product is Signavio Process Manager, a web-based business process modeling tool. The company was acquired by SAP in March 2021 for 950 million euros.

== History ==
The company was founded by a team of alumni from Hasso Plattner Institute (HPI) in Potsdam, Germany.

Prior to Signavio, the founders were involved in development of the world's first web modeler for BPMN at HPI. This technology, known as the "Oryx project", was published under an Open Source license and served as blueprint for the Signavio Process Manager.

Signavio is headquartered in Berlin, Germany. In 2012, the company was incorporated in the United States as Signavio Inc. with an office in Burlington, Massachusetts.

On July 11, 2019, Signavio raised $177 million, led by Apax Digital (the growth equity team of Apax Partners), with DTCP.

On January 21, 2021, SAP announced that it would acquire Signavio. The acquisition was completed on March 5, 2021.

== Awards ==
In 2011, the German Federal Ministry of Economy and Technology named Signavio "ICT startup of the Year" and selected the firm for its "German Silicon Valley Accelerator" program.
