= Australasian Conference on Information Systems =

ACIS Logo

The Australasian Conference on Information Systems (ACIS) is an annual conference for Information Systems and Information Technology academics and professionals and is affiliated with the Australasian Association for Information Systems. ACIS is the premier Information Systems conference within the Australasian region, targeting Information Systems academics and researchers. It covers technical, organisational, business and social issues in the application of Information Technology(IT) to real world problems.

ACIS provides a platform for panel discussions and the presentation of peer-reviewed information systems research papers.

The conference attracts hundreds of submissions each year, and those that are selected for presentation appear in the 'ACIS Proceedings’, which have been archived online since 2001.

The first Australian Conference in Information Systems (ACIS) took place in 1990 at Monash University and was chaired by Ross Jeffery. The name was changed to the Australasian Conference on Information Systems in 1994 to reflect the involvement of New Zealand, and attendance stabilised at approximately 250 delegates by 2007, having reached its peak in 2000.

The ACIS logo consists of a digital pixel background pattern with a human hand silhouette and a swooping arrow.

== ACIS Venues ==
The following table displays a list of past and near future ACIS conferences.

#	Year	Place	Host	Theme
38	2027	Melbourne, Australia		
37	2026, 02-04 December	Perth, Australia	Edith Cowan University	AI-Infused Information Systems: Capabilities, Transformation, and the Next Frontier
36	2025, 03-05 December	Brisbane, Australia	University of the Sunshine Coast	The State of the Information Systems Discipline: Challenges and Opportunities
35	2024, 04 – 06 December	Canberra, Australia	University of Canberra	Digital Futures for a Sustainable Society
34	2023, 05 – 08 December	Wellington, New Zealand	Victoria University of Wellington	Thriving in an uncertain digitized world // Te huarahi oranga i murimuri i te ao hangarau
33	2022, 04 – 07 December	Melbourne, Australia	University of Melbourne	The changing face of IS
32	2021, 06 –10 December	Sydney, Australia	Macquarie University	Information Systems for a Sustainable Future, Connectedness, and Social Good
31	2020, 01 – 04 December	Wellington, New Zealand	Victoria University of Wellington	Navigating the Digital Future
30	2019, 09 – 11 December	Perth, Australia	Curtin University	Making the World a Better Place with Information Systems
29	2018, 03 – 05 December	Sydney, Australia	University of Technology Sydney	Strategic Positioning
28	2017, 04 – 06 December	Hobart, Tasmania, Australia	The University of Tasmania	Data, Knowledge and Decisions
27	2016, 05 – 07 December	Wollongong, Australia	University of Wollongong	Occupying the Sweet Spot: IS at the Intersection
26	2015, 30 – 04 December	Adelaide, Australia	University of South Australia	Information Systems in the Age of Big Data
25	2014, 08 – 10 December	Auckland, New Zealand	Auckland University of Technology	Integral IS: The Embedding of Information Systems in Business, Government and Society
24	2013, 03 – 05 December	Melbourne, Australia	RMIT University	Information Systems: Transforming the Future
23	2012, 03 – 05 December	Geelong, Australia	Deakin University	Location, location, location
22	2011, 30 – 02 November/December	Sydney, Australia	University of Sydney	Identifying the Information Systems Discipline
21	2010, 01 – 03 December	Brisbane, Australia	Queensland University of Technology	Information Systems: Defining and Establishing a High Impact Discipline
20	2009, 02 – 04 December	Melbourne, Australia	Monash University	Evolving Boundaries and New Frontiers: Defining the IS Discipline
19	2008, 03 – 05 December	Christchurch, New Zealand	University of Canterbury	Creating the Future: Transforming Research into Practice
18	2007, 05 – 07 December	Toowoomba Queensland	University of Southern Queensland	The 3Rs: Research, Relevance and Rigour - Coming of Age
17	2006, 06 – 08 December	Adelaide, Australia	University of South Australia	Thought Leadership in IS
16	2005, 29 November – 02 December	Sydney, Australia	University of Technology Sydney	Socialising IT: Thinking About the People
15	2004, 01 – 03 December	Hobart, Australia	University of Tasmania	Managing New Wave Information Systems: Enterprise, Government and Society
14	2003, 26 – 28 November	Perth, Australia	Edith Cowan University	Delivering IT and e-Business Value in Networked Environments
13	2002, 03 – 06 December	Melbourne, Australia	Victoria University	Systems: Enabling Organisations and Society
12	2001, 05 – 07 December	Coffs Harbour, Australia	Southern Cross University	2001 IS Odyssey: Where are we going in Cyberspace?
11	2000, 06 – 08 December	Brisbane, Australia	Queensland University of Technology	
10	1999, 01 – 03 December	Wellington, New Zealand	Victoria University of Wellington	https://web.archive.org/web/20070608222800/http://www.vuw.ac.nz/acis99/
9	1998, 29 September – 02 October	Sydney, Australia	University of New South Wales	
8	1997, 29 September – 02 October	Adelaide, Australia	University of South Australia	
7	1996, 11 – 13 December	Hobart, Australia	University of Tasmania	
6	1995, 26 – 29 September	Perth, Australia	Curtin University of Technology	
5	1994, 27 – 29 September	Melbourne, Australia	Monash University	
4	1993, 28 – 30 September	Brisbane, Australia	University of Queensland	
3	1992, 05 – 08 October	Wollongong, Australia	University of Wollongong	
2	1991, 04 – 05 February	Sydney, Australia	University of New South Wales	
1	1990, 06 February	Melbourne, Australia	Monash University	

== See also ==
- Association for Information Systems
- Management Information Systems
