= EATPUT =

The EATPUT model is a model for analyzing an information system designed by Anthony Debons of the University of Pittsburgh's School of Information Science in 1961. It has been widely used in the fields of information systems and information science, in a variety of areas. One example is the use of the model in the design of information systems to serve remote islands.

The EATPUT model is so called because of the six fundamental components, which taken together form the acronym EATPUT.

== Event ==
The Event Phase details occurrences relevant to the information system and their representation to the information system. Representation to the system could take many forms such as sound or digitally coded data, depending on the information system. For example, a weather predicting machine's event could be an increase in humidity, represented to the system as directly as an increase in water vapor in the air.

== Acquisition ==
The Acquisition Phase is the sensor of an information system. The Acquisition Phase is where the system captures its data pertaining to the Event Phase. Continuing with the example of a weather predicting machine, the increase in water vapor in the air is detected by an instrument on the device.

== Transmission ==
Transmission actually occurs between each phase, but its most important (and most aesthetically pleasing to the acronym EATPUT) occurrence is the one between the Acquisition and Processing phases. Transmission is a fairly straightforward concept; it is how the different components and phases of an information system communicate with each other. Continuing with the weather predicting machine example again, the water vapor sensors might code the information digitally (this process itself would require yet another information system) and send it to the next phase.

== Processing ==
Processing is where the data is ordered, stored, retrieved, and operated on appropriately in order to form knowledge. The amount of humidity can be compared to past years and general meteorological principles in order to analyze the event of higher or lower humidity and translate it to something more useful (e.g. "the humidity is 60%).

== Utilization ==
The Utilization Phase of the system evaluates and interprets the Processing Phase's result. 60% humidity might mean that the chance of a thunderstorm is higher.

== Transfer ==
The Transfer Phase is the action component of the system, the implementation of the knowledge the other phases have generated. Perhaps the weather predicting machine, as it becomes more and more certain a severe thunderstorm is likely, will notify a human that can declare an appropriate storm warning or use the information for the television weather forecast.
