= Stefanie Rinderle-Ma =

German computer scientist

Stefanie Rinderle-Ma is a German computer scientist whose research concerns business information systems and business process management. She is a professor at the Technical University of Munich where she holds the Chair for Information Systems and Business Process Management.

== Education and career ==
Rinderle-Ma received a diploma (the German equivalent of a master's degree) in business mathematics from the University of Augsburg in 2000. She continued her studies at the University of Ulm, where she received a doctorate (Dr. rer. nat.), summa cum laude, in 2004. She also has a 2009 habilitation from the University of Ulm, completed after postdoctoral studies there with visits to several other institutions.

From 2010 to 2021 she worked in Austria as a professor in the Faculty of Computer Science at the University of Vienna, also serving as vice dean from 2010 to 2016. She took her present position as Chair for Information Systems and Business Process Management at TU Munich in 2021.

== Recognition ==
Rinderle-Ma was elected to the Academia Europaea in 2024.
