= Michel Mandjes =

Dutch mathematician (born 1970)

Michel R. H. Mandjes
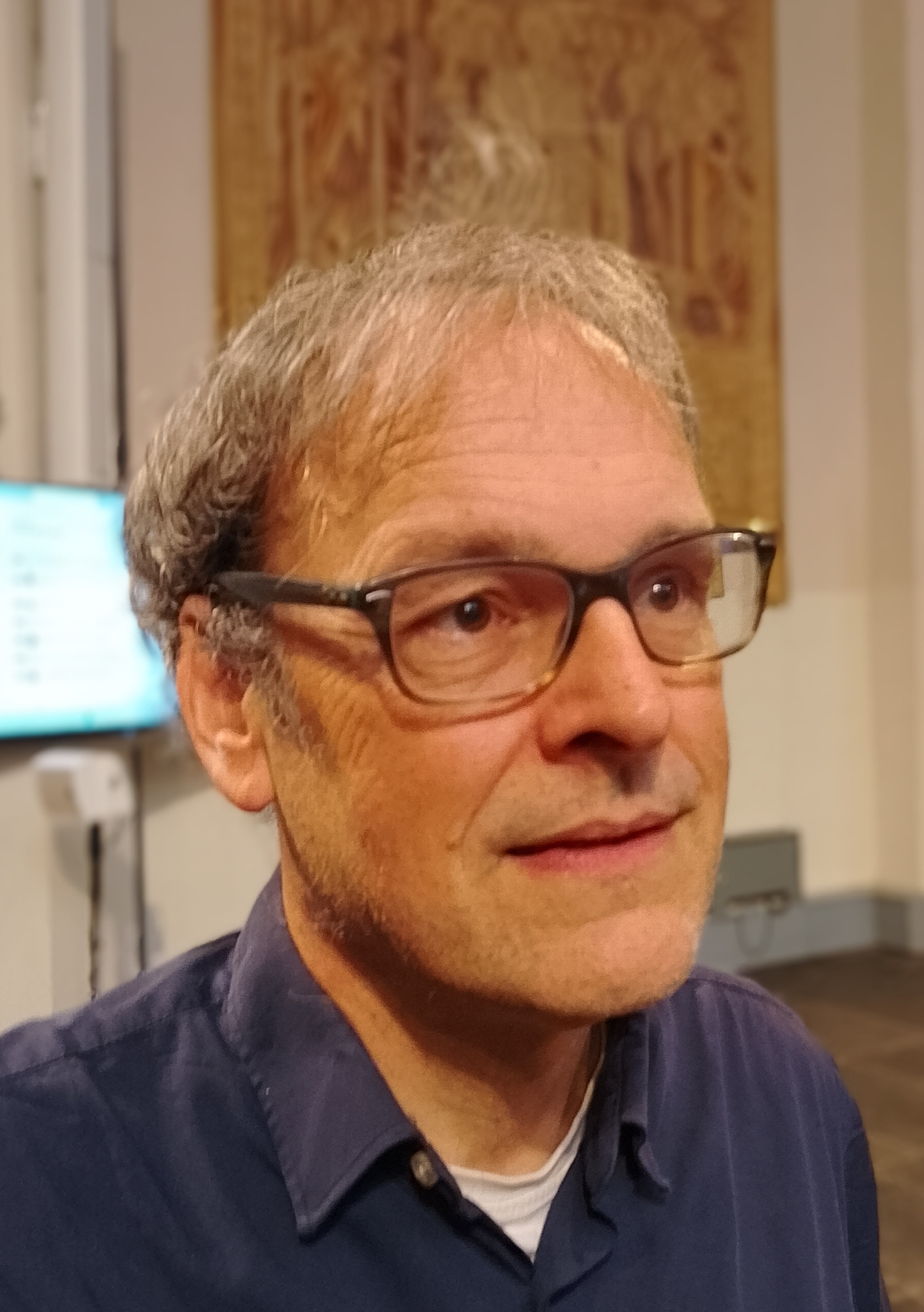
- Born: February 14, 1970 (age 56); Zaandam, the Netherlands
- Scientific career
- Fields: Mathematician
- Workplaces: University of Amsterdam; Leiden University
- Doctoral advisor: A. Ridder; H. Tijms

Michael Robertus Hendrikus "Michel" Mandjes (born 14 February 1970 in Zaandam) is a Dutch mathematician, known for several contributions to queueing theory and applied probability theory. His research interests include queueing models for telecommunications, traffic management and analysis, and network economics.

He holds a full-professorship (Applied Probability and Queueing Theory) at the University of Amsterdam (Korteweg-de Vries Institute for Mathematics). From September 2004 he is advisor of the "Queueing and Performance Analysis" theme at EURANDOM, Eindhoven.

He is author of the book "Large deviations for Gaussian queues", and is associate editor of the journals Stochastic Models and Queuing Systems.

He contributed to the book Queues and Lévy fluctuation theory, published in 2015.

== Books ==
- "Large deviations for Gaussian queues" (2007)
