= Jo van Nunen =

Dutch engineer (1945–2010)

Johannes Arnoldus Elizabeth Emmanuel van Nunen (23 December 1945 – 12 May 2010) was a Dutch engineer, management consultant, and Professor of Logistics at the Erasmus University Rotterdam, and expert in the field of logistics, Supply Chain Management and Operations Research.

== Biography ==
Born in Venlo, Van Nunen studied Applied Mathematics at the Eindhoven University of Technology, where he received his MA in 1971. There in 1976 he also received his PhD under supervision of Jaap Wessels with a thesis entitled "Contracting Markov decision processes".

After graduating in 1976, Van Nunen started his academic career in Eindhoven as associate professor. In 1978 he was visiting professor at North Carolina State University in the US for one year. In 1984 he was appointed professor at the Interuniversity Institute of Business Administration in Delft. In the late 1980s this institute was merged into the Erasmus University Rotterdam, and is now Rotterdam School of Management, Erasmus University. Among his PhD students was Walther Ploos van Amstel.

Van Nunen had been part-time management consultant at Deloitte from 1989 to 2006, and had founded his own consultancy firm in 2006. He was board member of the Vereniging Logistiek Management for many year, and was just elected president in 2009. He participated in the EICB (Expertise- en InnovatieCentrum Binnenvaart), and he was one of the founders of the Dinalog (Dutch Institute for Advanced Logistics) research institute in Breda. In 2007 he was awarded the IBM Faculty Award for all his scientific work.

Jo van Nunen died from cardiac arrest 12 May 2010 in Vancouver, Canada, where he had been attending a scientific congress.

== Publications ==
Van Nunen authored and co-authored many publications in the fields of logistics, Supply Chain Management and Operations Research. Books, a selection:

- Nunen, Jo van, Contracting Markov decision processes. PhD thesis Eindhoven University of Technology, 1976.
- Nunen, Jo van & Jacques Benders. Een decision support systeem voor locatie en allocatie problemen bij een drankenconcern, 1982.
- Nunen, Jo van & Jacob Wijngaard (eds.). Personeelplanning : theorie en praktijk, Alphen aan den Rijn : Samsom, 1983.
- Nunen, Jo van. Beslissings-ondersteunende systemen : een blijvende uitdaging.. Inaugural lecture, Interuniversitair Instituut Bedrijfskunde, 1984.
- Nunen, Jo van, Hans van der Heijden & Rene Wagenaar. Organisational redesign through telecommunications exploring authority shifts in agency relationships, 1993..
- Nunen, Jo van & Leonard Verspui. SimLog: simulatie en logistiek rond de haven, 1999.
