= European Institute for Statistics, Probability, Stochastic Operations Research and its Applications =

Research institute

Coordinates: 51°26′51.5″N 5°29′14.86″E

The European Institute for Statistics, Probability, Stochastic Operations Research and its Applications (EURANDOM) is a research institute at the Eindhoven University of Technology, dedicated to fostering research in the stochastic sciences and their applications.

The institute was founded in 1997 at the Eindhoven University of Technology to focus on project oriented research of "stochastic problems connected to industrial and societal applications." The institute actively attracts young talent for its research and doctoral programs, facilitates research and actively seeks European cooperation.

== People associated with the institute ==
- Michel Mandjes
- Onno J. Boxma, scientific director from 2005 to 2010.
- Jaap Wessels
