= Information system =

System that supports business decisions

An information system (IS) is a formal, sociotechnical, and organizational system designed to collect, process, store, and distribute information. From a sociotechnical perspective, information systems comprise four components: task, people, structure (or roles), and technology. Information systems can be defined as an integration of components for collection, storage and processing of data, comprising digital products that process data to facilitate decision making and the data being used to provide information and contribute to knowledge.

A computer information system is a system, which consists of people and computers that process or interpret information. The term is also sometimes used to simply refer to a computer system with software installed.

"Information systems" is also an academic field of study about systems with a specific reference to information and the complementary networks of computer hardware and software that people and organizations use to collect, filter, process, create and also distribute data. An emphasis is placed on an information system having a definitive boundary, users, processors, storage, inputs, outputs and the aforementioned communication networks.

In many organizations, the department or unit responsible for information systems and data processing is known as "information services".

Any specific information system aims to support operations, management and decision-making. An information system is the information and communication technology (ICT) that an organization uses, and also the way in which people interact with this technology in support of business processes.

Some authors make a clear distinction between information systems, computer systems, and business processes. Information systems typically include an ICT component but are not purely concerned with ICT, focusing instead on the end-use of information technology. Information systems are also different from business processes. Information systems help to control the performance of business processes.

Alter argues that viewing an information system as a special type of work system has its advantages. A work system is a system in which humans or machines perform processes and activities using resources to produce specific products or services for customers. An information system is a work system in which activities are devoted to capturing, transmitting, storing, retrieving, manipulating and displaying information.

As such, information systems inter-relate with data systems on the one hand and activity systems on the other. An information system is a form of communication system in which data represent and are processed as a form of social memory. An information system can also be considered a semi-formal language which supports human decision making and action.

Information systems are the primary focus of study for organizational informatics.

== Overview ==
Silver et al. (1995) provided two views on IS that includes software, hardware, data, people, and procedures.

The Association for Computing Machinery defines "Information systems specialists [as] focus[ing] on integrating information technology solutions and business processes to meet the information needs of businesses and other enterprises."

There are various types of information systems, : including transaction processing systems, decision support systems, knowledge management systems, learning management systems, database management systems, and office information systems. Critical to most information systems are information technologies, which are typically designed to enable humans to perform tasks for which the human brain is not well suited, such as: handling large amounts of information, performing complex calculations, and controlling many simultaneous processes.

Information technologies are a malleable resource available to executives. Many companies have created a position of chief information officer (CIO) that sits on the executive board with the chief executive officer (CEO), chief financial officer (CFO), chief operating officer (COO), and chief technical officer (CTO). The CTO may also serve as CIO, and vice versa. The chief information security officer (CISO) focuses on information security management.

=== Six components ===
The six components that must come together in order to produce an information system are:

1. Hardware: The term hardware refers to machinery and equipment. In a modern information system, this category includes the computer itself and all of its support equipment. The support equipment includes input and output devices, storage devices and communications devices. In pre-computer information systems, the hardware might include ledger books and ink.
2. Software: The term software refers to computer programs and the manuals (if any) that support them. Computer programs are machine-readable instructions that direct the circuitry within the hardware parts of the system to function in ways that produce useful information from data. Programs are generally stored on some input/output medium, often a disk or tape. The "software" for pre-computer information systems included how the hardware was prepared for use (e.g., column headings in the ledger book) and instructions for using them (the guidebook for a card catalog).
3. Data: Data are facts that are used by systems to produce useful information. In modern information systems, data are generally stored in machine-readable form on disk or tape until the computer needs them. In pre-computer information systems, the data were generally stored in human-readable form.
4. Procedures: Procedures are the policies that govern the operation of an information system. "Procedures are to people what software is to hardware" is a common analogy that is used to illustrate the role of procedures in a system.
5. People: Every system needs people if it is to be useful. Often the most overlooked element of the system is the people, probably the component that most influences the success or failure of information systems. This includes "not only the users, but those who operate and service the computers, those who maintain the data, and those who support the network of computers".
6. Internet: The internet is a combination of data and people. (Although this component is not necessary for functionality.)

Data is the bridge between hardware and people. This means that the data we collect is only data until we involve people. At that point, data becomes information.

== Types ==
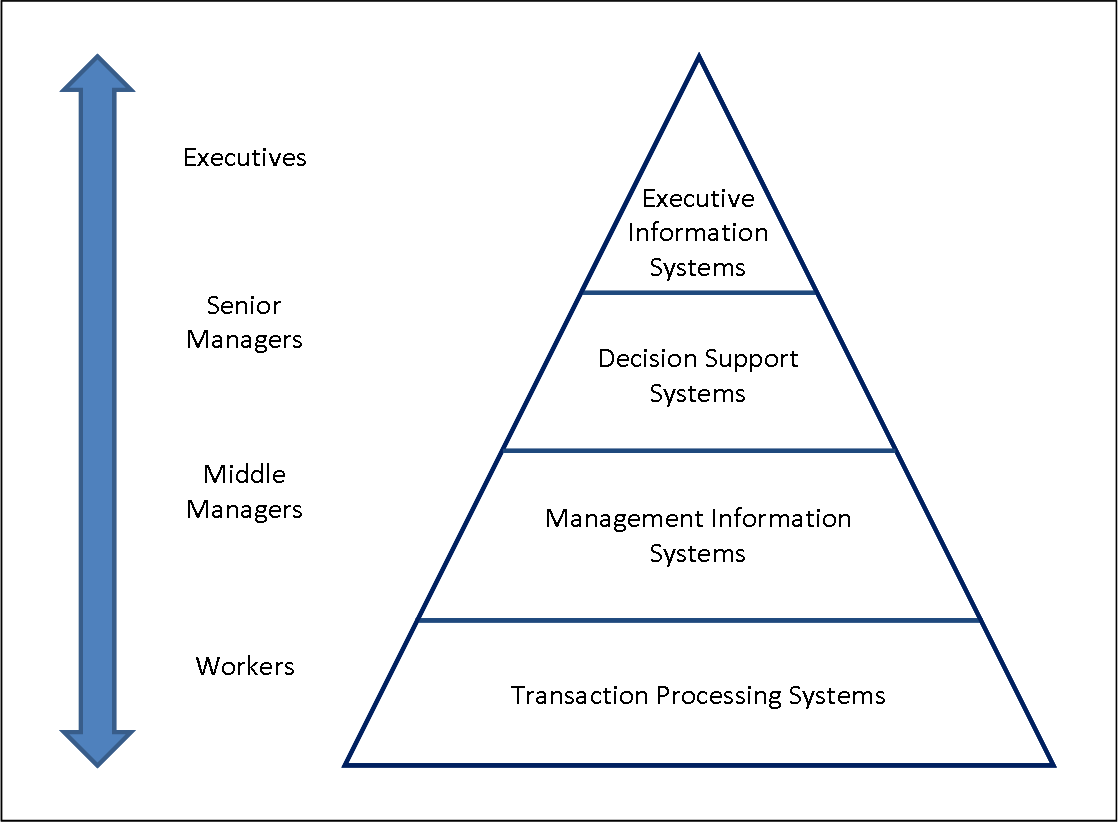
A four level hierarchy

The "classic" view of Information systems found in textbooks in the 1980s was a pyramid of systems that reflected the hierarchy of the organization, usually transaction processing systems at the bottom of the pyramid, followed by management information systems, decision support systems, and ending with executive information systems at the top. Although the pyramid model remains useful since it was first formulated, a number of new technologies have been developed and new categories of information systems have emerged, some of which no longer fit easily into the original pyramid model.

Some examples of such systems are:

- Artificial intelligence system
- Computing platform
- Data warehouses
- Decision support system
- Enterprise resource planning
- Enterprise systems
- Expert systems
- Geographic information system
- Global information system
- Management information system
- Multimedia information system
- Office automation
- Process control system
- Search engines
- Social information systems

A computer(-based) information system is essentially an IS using computer technology to carry out some or all of its planned tasks. The basic components of computer-based information systems are:

- Hardware are the devices like the monitor, processor, printer, and keyboard, all of which work together to accept, process, show data, and information.
- Software are the programs that allow the hardware to process the data.
- Databases are the gathering of associated files or tables containing related data.
- Networks are a connecting system that allows diverse computers to distribute resources.
- Procedures are the commands for combining the components above to process information and produce the preferred output.

The first four components (hardware, software, database, and network) make up what is known as the information technology platform. Information technology workers could then use these components to create information systems that watch over safety measures, risk and the management of data. These actions are known as information technology services.

Certain information systems support parts of organizations, others support entire organizations, and still others, support groups of organizations. Each department or functional area within an organization has its own collection of application programs or information systems. These functional area information systems (FAIS) support specific functional areas and act as foundations for higher-level systems such as business intelligence systems and dashboards.As the name suggests, each FAIS supports a particular function within the organization, e.g.: accounting IS, finance IS, production-operation management (POM) IS, marketing IS, and human resources IS. In finance and accounting, managers use IT systems to forecast revenues and business activity, to determine the best sources and uses of funds, and to perform audits to ensure that the organization is fundamentally sound and that all financial reports and documents are accurate.

Other types of organizational information systems are FAIS, transaction processing systems, enterprise resource planning, office automation system, management information system, decision support system, expert system, executive dashboard, supply chain management system, and electronic commerce system. Dashboards are a special form of IS that support all managers of the organization. They provide rapid access to timely information and direct access to structured information in the form of reports. Expert systems attempt to duplicate the work of human experts by applying reasoning capabilities, knowledge, and expertise within a specific domain.

== Development ==
Information technology departments in larger organizations tend to strongly influence the development, use, and application of information technology in the business. A series of methodologies and processes can be used to develop and use an information system. Many developers use a systems engineering approach such as the system development life cycle (SDLC), to systematically develop an information system in stages. The stages of the system development lifecycle are planning, system analysis, and requirements, system design, development, integration and testing, implementation and operations, and maintenance. Recent research aims at enabling and measuring the ongoing, collective development of such systems within an organization by the entirety of human actors themselves. An information system can be developed in house (within the organization) or outsourced. This can be accomplished by outsourcing certain components or the entire system. A specific case is the geographical distribution of the development team (offshoring, global information system).

A computer-based information system, following a definition of Langefors, is a technologically implemented medium for recording, storing, and disseminating linguistic expressions, as well as for drawing conclusions from such expressions.

Geographic information systems, land information systems, and disaster information systems are examples of emerging information systems, but they can be broadly considered as spatial information systems. System development is done in stages which include:

- Problem recognition and specification
- Information gathering
- Requirements specification for the new system
- System design
- System construction
- System implementation
- Review and maintenance

== As an academic discipline ==
The field of study called information systems encompasses a variety of topics including systems analysis and design, computer networking, information security, database management, and decision support systems. Information management deals with the practical and theoretical problems of collecting and analyzing information in a business function area including business productivity tools, applications programming and implementation, electronic commerce, digital media production, data mining, and decision support. Communications and networking deals with telecommunication technologies. Information systems bridges business and computer science using the theoretical foundations of information and computation to study various business models and related algorithmic processes on building the IT systems within a computer science discipline. Computer information systems (CIS) is a field studying computers and algorithmic processes, including their principles, their software and hardware designs, their applications, and their impact on society, whereas IS emphasizes functionality over design.

Several IS scholars have debated the nature and foundations of information systems which have its roots in other reference disciplines such as computer science, engineering, mathematics, management science, cybernetics, and others. Information systems also can be defined as a collection of hardware, software, data, people, and procedures that work together to produce quality information.

=== Related terms ===
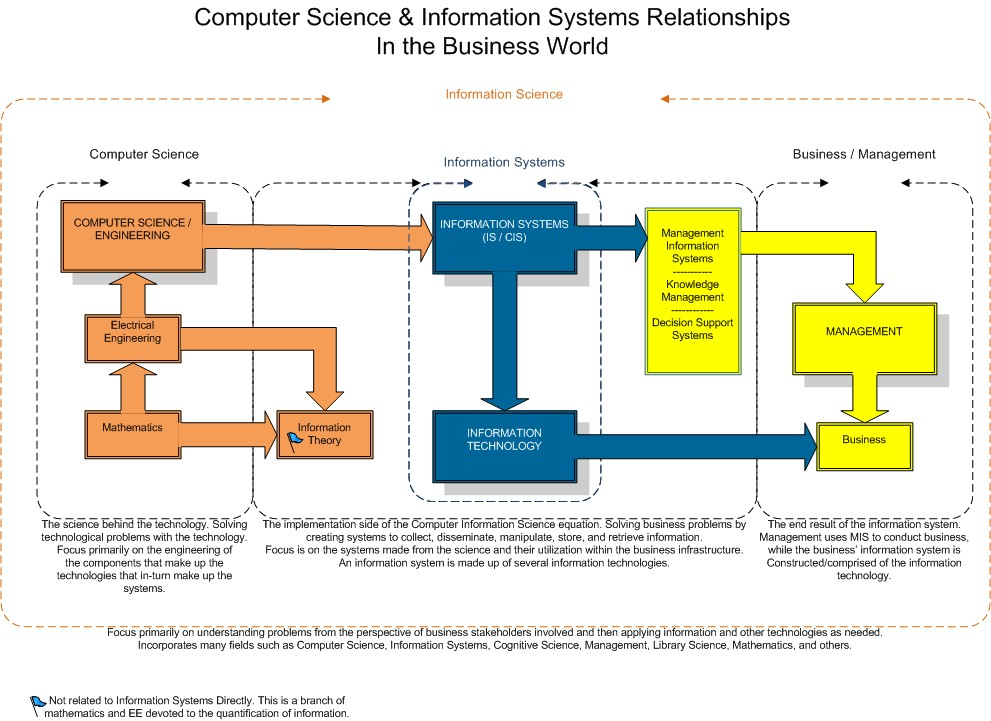
Information systems relationship to information technology, computer science, information science, and business.

Similar to computer science, other disciplines can be seen as both related and foundation disciplines of IS. The domain of study of IS involves the study of theories and practices related to the social and technological phenomena, which determine the development, use, and effects of information systems in organizations and society. But, while there may be considerable overlap of the disciplines at the boundaries, the disciplines are still differentiated by the focus, purpose, and orientation of their activities.

In a broad scope, information systems is a scientific field of study that addresses the range of strategic, managerial, and operational activities involved in the gathering, processing, storing, distributing, and use of information and its associated technologies in society and organizations. The term information systems is also used to describe an organizational function that applies IS knowledge in the industry, government agencies, and not-for-profit organizations.

Information systems often refers to the interaction between algorithmic processes and technology. This interaction can occur within or across organizational boundaries. An information system is a technology an organization uses and also the way in which the organizations interact with the technology and the way in which the technology works with the organization's business processes. Information systems are distinct from information technology (IT) in that an information system has an information technology component that interacts with the processes' components.

One problem with that approach is that it prevents the IS field from being interested in non-organizational use of ICT, such as in social networking, computer gaming, mobile personal usage, etc. A different way of differentiating the IS field from its neighbours is to ask, "Which aspects of reality are most meaningful in the IS field and other fields?" This approach, based on philosophy, helps to define not just the focus, purpose, and orientation, but also the dignity, destiny and, responsibility of the field among other fields.

Business informatics is a related discipline that is well-established in several countries, especially in Europe. While Information systems has been said to have an "explanation-oriented" focus, business informatics has a more "solution-oriented" focus and includes information technology elements and construction and implementation-oriented elements.

== Career pathways ==
Information systems workers enter a number of different careers:

- Information system strategy
- Management information systems – A management information system (MIS) is an information system used for decision-making, and for the coordination, control, analysis, and visualization of information in an organization.
- Project management – Project management is the practice of initiating, planning, executing, controlling, and closing the work of a team to achieve specific goals and meet specific success criteria at the specified time.
- Enterprise architecture – A well-defined practice for conducting enterprise analysis, design, planning, and implementation, using a comprehensive approach at all times, for the successful development and execution of strategy.
- IS development
- IS organization
- IS consulting
- IS security
- IS auditing

There is a wide variety of career paths in the information systems discipline. "Workers with specialized technical knowledge and strong communications skills will have the best prospects. Workers with management skills and an understanding of business practices and principles will have excellent opportunities, as companies are increasingly looking to technology to drive their revenue."

Information technology is important to the operation of contemporary businesses, it offers many employment opportunities. The information systems field includes the people in organizations who design and build information systems, the people who use those systems, and the people responsible for managing those systems. The demand for traditional IT staff such as programmers, business analysts, systems analysts, and designer is significant. Many well-paid jobs exist in areas of Information technology. At the top of the list is the chief information officer (CIO).

The CIO is the executive who is in charge of the IS function. In most organizations, the CIO works with the chief executive officer (CEO), the chief financial officer (CFO), and other senior executives. Therefore, he or she actively participates in the organization's strategic planning process.

=== Bachelor of Business Information Systems ===
Bachelor of Business Information Systems (BBIS), also Business Information Systems (BIS), is an information technology (IT) and management focused undergraduate program designed to better understand the needs of rapidly growing technology in business and IT sector. It is bachelor degree that combines elements of business administration and computer science with majoring on information systems and technology.The purpose of this course is to equip students with the skills and knowledge needed to effectively manage and utilize information technology in a business and IT industry.

== Research ==
Information systems research is generally interdisciplinary concerned with the study of the effects of information systems on the behaviour of individuals, groups, and organizations. Hevner et al. (2004) categorized research in IS into two scientific paradigms including behavioural science which is to develop and verify theories that explain or predict human or organizational behavior and design science which extends the boundaries of human and organizational capabilities by creating new and innovative artifacts.

Salvatore March and Gerald Smith proposed a framework for researching different aspects of information technology including outputs of the research (research outputs) and activities to carry out this research (research activities). They identified research outputs as follows:

1. Constructs which are concepts that form the vocabulary of a domain. They constitute a conceptualization used to describe problems within the domain and to specify their solutions.
2. A model which is a set of propositions or statements expressing relationships among constructs.
3. A method which is a set of steps (an algorithm or guideline) used to perform a task. Methods are based on a set of underlying constructs and a representation (model) of the solution space.
4. An instantiation is the realization of an artefact in its environment.

Also research activities including:

1. Build an artefact to perform a specific task.
2. Evaluate the artefact to determine if any progress has been achieved.
3. Given an artefact whose performance has been evaluated, it is important to determine why and how the artefact worked or did not work within its environment. Therefore, theorize and justify theories about IT artefacts.

Although Information Systems as a discipline has been evolving for over 30 years now, the core focus or identity of IS research is still subject to debate among scholars. There are two main views around this debate: a narrow view focusing on the IT artifact as the core subject matter of IS research, and a broad view that focuses on the interplay between social and technical aspects of IT that is embedded into a dynamic evolving context. A third view calls on IS scholars to pay balanced attention to both the IT artifact and its context.

Since the study of information systems is an applied field, industry practitioners expect information systems research to generate findings that are immediately applicable in practice. This is not always the case however, as information systems researchers often explore behavioral issues in much more depth than practitioners would expect them to do. This may render information systems research results difficult to understand, and has led to criticism.

In the last ten years, the business trend is represented by the considerable increase of Information Systems Function (ISF) role, especially with regard to the enterprise strategies and operations supporting. It became a key factor to increase productivity and to support value creation. To study an information system itself, rather than its effects, information systems models are used, such as EATPUT.

The international body of Information Systems researchers, the Association for Information Systems (AIS), and its Senior Scholars Forum Subcommittee on Journals (202), proposed a list of 11 journals that the AIS deems as 'excellent'. According to the AIS, this list of journals recognizes topical, methodological, and geographical diversity. The review processes are stringent, editorial board members are widely-respected and recognized, and there is international readership and contribution. The list is (or should be) used, along with others, as a point of reference for promotion and tenure and, more generally, to evaluate scholarly excellence.

A number of annual information systems conferences are run in various parts of the world, the majority of which are peer reviewed. The AIS directly runs the International Conference on Information Systems (ICIS) and the Americas Conference on Information Systems (AMCIS), while AIS affiliated conferences include the Pacific Asia Conference on Information Systems (PACIS), European Conference on Information Systems (ECIS), the Mediterranean Conference on Information Systems (MCIS), the International Conference on Information Resources Management (Conf-IRM) and the Wuhan International Conference on E-Business (WHICEB). AIS chapter conferences include Australasian Conference on Information Systems (ACIS), Scandinavian Conference on Information Systems (SCIS), Information Systems International Conference (ISICO), Conference of the Italian Chapter of AIS (itAIS), Annual Mid-Western AIS Conference (MWAIS) and Annual Conference of the Southern AIS (SAIS). EDSIG, which is the special interest group on education of the AITP, organizes the Conference on Information Systems and Computing Education and the Conference on Information Systems Applied Research which are both held annually in November.

== See also ==
Related subjects

- Formative context
- Human–computer interaction
- Informatics
  - Bioinformatics
  - Business informatics
  - Cheminformatics
  - Disaster informatics
  - Geoinformatics
  - Health informatics
- Information science
- Library science
- Web sciences

Components

- Data architect
- Data modeling
- Data processing system
- Data Reference Model
- Database
- EATPUT
- Metadata
- Predictive Model Markup Language
- Semantic translation
- Three schema approach

Implementation

- Enterprise information system
- Environmental Modeling Center
- Institute for Operations Research and the Management Sciences (INFORMS)
