= Roseman =

Surname

Roseman is a surname. Notable people with the surname include:

- Chief Roseman (1856–1938), American Major League Baseball player from Brooklyn, New York
- Edward Roseman (1875–1957), American actor, primarily during the silent film era
- Harry Roseman (born 1945), sculptor, photographer, draftsman, practitioner of web based works, and professor of art at Vassar College
- Howie Roseman (born 1975), the general manager for the Philadelphia Eagles of the National Football League
- Jordan Roseman (aka DJ Earworm), a San Francisco-based mashup artist
- Josh Roseman, American jazz trombonist
- Mark Roseman (born 1958), English historian of modern Europe with particular interest in The Holocaust
- Stevie "Keys" Roseman (Steve Roseman), a keyboardist and performer born in Oakland, California
- Saul Roseman (1921–2011), an American biochemist at Johns Hopkins University

== See also ==
- Roseman Covered Bridge, historic covered bridge in Winterset, Iowa
- Roseman University of Health Sciences, private, non-profit university located in the city of Henderson, Nevada
