= Henk Zijm =

Dutch mathematician

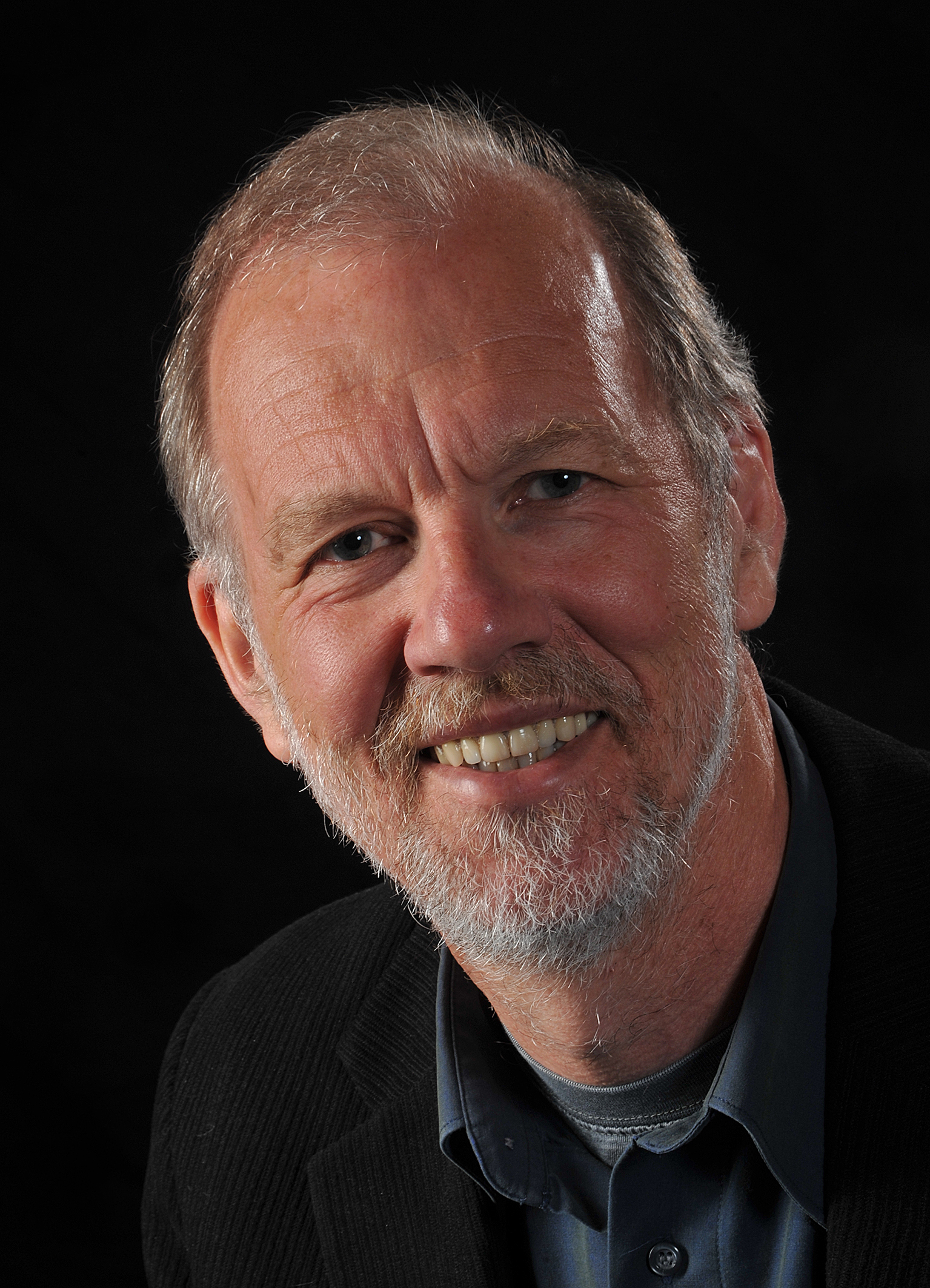
Zijm (2010)

Willem Hendrik Maria (Henk) Zijm (born 3 May 1952) is a Dutch mathematician, and Professor Production and Supply Chain Management and Emeritus Rector Magnificus (2005–2009) at the University of Twente.

== Biography ==
Born in Driehuizen, Texel, Zijm received both his BSc in mathematics, physics and astronomy in 1977, and his MSc cum laude in applied mathematics at the University of Amsterdam. In 1982 he received his Phd in operations research at the Eindhoven University of Technology under supervision of Jaap Wessels and Gerhard Willem Veltkamp with a thesis entitled "Nonnegative Matrices in Dynamic Programming."

Zijm had started his academic career in 1981 as assistant professor at the Department of Actuarial Sciences and Econometrics of the University of Amsterdam. From 1983 to 1990 he worked in industry at Philips in Eindhoven as consultant in the fields of Operations Research, Logistic Management and Manufacturing Planning and Control. In 1987 he was appointed part-time as professor in mathematical models for operations management at the Eindhoven University of Technology. In 1990 he moved to the University of Twente, where he became professor in production and operations management. Zijm supervised around 150 master students and more than 30 PhD students, among them were Ivo Adan (1991), Geert-Jan van Houtum (1995), Erwin Hans (2001) and Nelly Litvak (2002).

From 2000 to 2002, Zijm also directed the Center for Telematics and Information Technology (CTIT). From 2002 to 2004, he chaired the Faculty of Electrical Engineering, Mathematics and Computer Science, and from 2005 to 2009 he was Rector Magnificus of the University of Twente as successor of Frans van Vught. Since 2009, he has been professor in production and supply chain management, and since 2011, director of the Dutch Institute for Advanced Logistics (DINALOG) in Breda. Zijm retired in 2018.

== Publications ==
Zijm has authored and co-authored numerous publications. A selection:

- Meester, Geatse, and Henk Zijm. "Multi-resource scheduling of an FMC in discrete parts manufacturing." Operations Research Proceedings 1993. Springer Berlin Heidelberg, 1994. 137–137.
- Zijm, Henk, and Geert-Jan Van Houtum. "On multi-stage production/inventory systems under stochastic demand." International Journal of Production Economics 35.1 (1994): 391–400.
- Buitenhek, Ronald, Geert‐Jan van Houtum, and Henk Zijm. "AMVA‐based solution procedures for open queueing networks with population constraints." Annals of Operations Research 93.1–4 (2000): 15–40.
- Zijm, W. Henk, and Zeynep Müge Avşar. "Capacitated two-indenture models for repairable item systems." International Journal of Production Economics 81 (2003): 573–588.
- Avsar, Zeynep Muge, and W. Henk Zijm. "Capacitated two-echelon inventory models for repairable item systems." Analysis and modeling of manufacturing systems. Springer US, 2003. 1–36.
