= Workflow pattern =

Specialized form of design pattern

A workflow pattern is a specialized form of design pattern as defined in the area of software engineering or business process engineering. Workflow patterns refer specifically to recurrent problems and proven solutions related to the development of workflow applications in particular, and more broadly, process-oriented applications.

== Concept ==
Workflow patterns are concepts of economised development. Their usage should follow strategies of simplifying maintenance and reducing modelling work. Workflow is performed in real time. The mechanisms of control must support the typical pace of work. Design patterns must delay execution of workflow.

=== Aggregation ===
Workflow patterns may usually be aggregated as chains and the conditions for starting and terminating must be explicitly defined.

=== Application ===
Workflow patterns can be applied in various context, hence the conditions for use must be explicitly defined and shown in order to prevent misinterpretation.

== Van der Aalst classification ==
A well-known collection of workflow patterns is that proposed by Wil van der Aalst et al. (2003) in their paper Workflow Patterns. with earlier versions published in 2000–02. This collection of patterns focuses on one specific aspect of process-oriented application development, namely the description of control flow dependencies between activities in a workflow/process. These patterns are divided into the following categories:

=== Basic Control Patterns ===
- Sequence - execute two or more activities in sequence
- Parallel Split - execute two or more activities in any order or in parallel
- Synchronize - synchronize two or more activities that may execute in any order or in parallel; do not proceed with the execution of subsequent activities until all preceding activities have completed; also known as barrier synchronization.
- Exclusive Choice - choose one execution path from many alternatives based on data that is available when the execution of the process reaches the exclusive choice
- Simple Merge - wait for one among a set of activities to complete before proceeding; it is assumed that only one of these activities will be executed; typically, these activities are on different paths stemming from an exclusive choice or a deferred choice (see below)
- Terminate - terminate execution of activities upon defined event or status change

=== Advanced Branching and Synchronization Patterns ===
- Multiple Choice - choose several execution paths from many alternatives
- Conditional Choice - choose one execution path from many alternatives according to discriminated status conditions
- Synchronizing Merge - merge many execution paths; synchronize if many paths are taken; do the same as for a simple merge if only one execution path is taken
- Multiple Merge - wait for one among a set of activities to complete before proceeding; if several of the activities being waited for are executed, the simple merge fires each time that one of them completes.
- Discriminator - wait for one of a set of activities to complete before proceeding; if several of the activities being waited for are executed, the discriminator only fires once.
- N-out-of-M Join - same as the discriminator but it is now possible to wait until more than one of the preceding activities completes before proceeding by setting a parameter N to some natural number greater than one.

=== Structural Patterns ===
- Arbitrary Cycle - do not impose any structural restrictions on the types of loops that can exist in the process model.
- Implicitly Terminate - terminate an instance of the process if there is nothing else to be done

=== Multiple Instances (MI) ===
- MI without synchronizing - generate many instances of one activity without synchronizing them afterwards
- MI with a prior known design time knowledge - generate many instances of one activity when the number of instances is known at the design time (with synchronization)
- MI with a prior known runtime knowledge - generate many instances of one activity when a number of instances can be determined at some point during the runtime (as in FOR loop but in parallel)
- MI without a prior runtime knowledge - generate many instances of one activity when a number of instances cannot be determined (as in WHILE loop but in parallel)

=== State-based patterns ===
- Deferred Choice - execute one of a number of alternative threads. The choice which thread is to be executed is not based on data that is available at the moment when the execution has reached the deferred choice, but is rather determined by an event (e.g. an application user selecting a task from the worklist, or a message being received by the process execution engine).
- Interleaved Parallel Routing - execute a number of activities in any order (e.g. based on availability of resources), but do not execute any of these activities simultaneously.
- Milestone - allow a certain activity at any time before the milestone is reached, after which the activity can no longer be executed.

=== Cancellation Patterns ===
- Cancel Activity - stop the execution of an enabled activity
- Cancel Case - stop the execution of a running process
- Cancel Wait - continue execution of a running process without prior completion event

The above workflow patterns have been used to evaluate the functionality of commercial products supporting the development of process-oriented applications. They have also been used to evaluate a number of proposed standards, including BPEL, BPMN, UML Activity diagram, XPDL, etc. It has been noted that not all these patterns are relevant in all application domains, so care must be taken when using the above workflow patterns to select a particular language or system for a given application.

The workflow patterns have also been used as initial requirements in the design of a workflow language and open-source system called YAWL (Yet Another Workflow Language).

Several extensions to the above set of workflow patterns have been proposed. In particular, the same research groups that developed these patterns, have also proposed a set of Workflow Data Patterns, Workflow Resource Patterns, Workflow Exception Handling Patterns, and Service Interaction Patterns.

== Another classification ==
Another classification of workflow patterns is the following:

Independent/Pooled
where each component of scheduled work is completed independent of each other component and no component has a specific dependency on any other component. An example would be where staff are serving at a counter - Raoul can serve a customer in his queue without waiting for Jamie to serve a customer in his queue.
Sequential
where each component of scheduled work is dependent on the preceding component. In this case the preceding component controls the advancement of the workflow through subsequent components. An example would be on a production line - Betty cannot affix the radiator cap to the Model T Ford until Veronica has put the radiator in place.
Interdependent/Networked
where each component of scheduled work is dependent on one or a number of other components being completed. In this case the preceding components control the workflow through subsequent components. An example would be a project team - Sarah must wait for several tasks to be completed by Kevin and George before she can execute her task.

== Other perspectives ==
The workflow patterns are not limited to control-flow. Other (workflow) pattern collections include:

- resource patterns,
- data patterns,
- exception patterns,
- service interaction patterns.
- parallelism and pipelining patterns.

These patterns collections have been used to evaluate a variety of workflow processes, both commercial (Websphere, Oracle BPEL, Staffware, SAP workflow, Windows Workflow Foundation, etc.) and open source.

== Workflow systems implementing patterns ==
- Tavaxy is a cloud-based workflow system that implements a pattern-based approach for enabling interoperability between Galaxy and Taverna, two workflow engines popular in the bioinformatics domain,
- YAWL, Yet Another Workflow Language,
