= Management information system =

Information system used for organizational decision-making and coordination

A management information system (MIS) is an information system designed to support decision-making, coordination, control, analysis, and visualization of information within an organization. The study of management information systems examines the interplay between people, processes, and technology in an organizational context, encompassing key managerial functions such as planning, controlling, and strategic decision-making.

In a corporate setting, the ultimate goal of a management information system is to increase the value and profitability of the business by providing managers with timely and relevant information for informed decision-making.

== Terminology and scope ==
The term Management Information Systems (MIS) broadly refers to organized systems that support the collection, processing, storage, and analysis of data for managerial purposes within an organization. Common functions of an MIS include decision support, transaction processing, reporting, and performance monitoring. The term generally excludes systems focused solely on software infrastructure or technical operations, distinguishing MIS from broader information technology management.

Several related disciplines are frequently conflated with MIS, though each has a distinct focus. MIS is a hierarchical subset of information systems (IS), distinguished by its emphasis on leveraging information technology to increase business value. By contrast, computer science is concerned with the theory and practice of computation, including algorithms, data structures, and software engineering, while computer engineering is primarily concerned with hardware architecture. Information technology management (IT management) refers to the operational oversight of an IT department, which may include MIS functions among its responsibilities.

As an academic and professional discipline, MIS examines the interactions among technology, people, and information, with the goal of solving business problems and improving organizational processes.

== History ==
While the origins of management information systems can be traced back to basic practices such as ledger-based accounting, the modern history of MIS is commonly divided into five eras, a framework outlined by Kenneth C. Laudon and Jane Laudon in their textbook Management Information Systems.

The first era was dominated by mainframe and minicomputer computing. IBM was the leading provider of both hardware and software during this period. These early systems occupied entire rooms and required dedicated teams to operate. As the technology matured, processing capacity increased while costs declined, enabling larger organizations to establish in-house computing centers.

The second era was marked by the rise of personal computers. Beginning in the late 1970s and accelerating through the 1980s, microprocessor technology steadily reduced the cost of computing, shifting processing power from centralized data centers to individual desktops. The introduction of the IBM PC in 1981 broadened business adoption, and influential software such as VisiCalc demonstrated the practical value of personal computing. This proliferation of affordable computers also created demand for interconnecting networks and contributed to the early growth of the Internet.

The third era emerged with client–server networks. As costs continued to fall and organizational needs grew more complex, businesses required systems that allowed employees to share information across an enterprise. Client–server architectures enabled thousands of users to access data simultaneously through internal networks known as intranets.

The fourth era centered on enterprise computing. High-speed networks made it possible to consolidate previously department-specific applications into integrated platforms known as enterprise software, connecting all major business functions and providing comprehensive information access across the full managerial structure.

The fifth era is characterized by cloud computing, in which computing resources and MIS platforms are delivered as services over the Internet rather than maintained on-premises. Cloud-based systems offer greater scalability, flexibility, and reduced infrastructure costs, and have become a dominant model for modern MIS deployment.

== Theoretical foundations ==
Management Information Systems draw on several interdisciplinary foundations, including management science, organizational theory, computer science, and systems theory.

Systems theory views organizations as interconnected components working toward common objectives, providing a conceptual basis for understanding how information flows through an organization. The related socio-technical systems perspective recognizes that the effectiveness of an MIS depends not only on its technical design but also on how it interacts with human behavior and organizational culture.

Decision theory and information processing theory explain how managers use structured information to reduce uncertainty, while information quality theory examines dimensions such as accuracy, timeliness, and completeness to assess whether systems effectively support managerial decisions. Behavioral models of decision-making further inform MIS design by recognizing that managers operate under bounded rationality, relying on simplified models rather than exhaustive analysis.

== Role in business strategy ==
Management Information Systems play a significant role in aligning technology with organizational strategy. By integrating data across departments such as marketing, finance, operations, and human resources, MIS enables managers to identify trends, allocate resources, and respond to changing market conditions. Organizations use MIS to support competitive strategies including cost leadership, differentiation, and rapid market responsiveness.

Strategic alignment theory, notably articulated by Henderson and Venkatraman, suggests that organizations perform better when their information systems strategy is aligned with their business strategy. MIS supports this alignment by connecting operational data with executive-level decision-making processes. Porter's competitive strategy framework has also been widely applied to MIS research, examining how information systems can create or sustain competitive advantages.

IT governance—the structures and processes that ensure technology investments support organizational goals—provides the institutional foundation for this alignment. Governance mechanisms may include steering committees, investment review boards, formal project management methodologies, and performance auditing.

== Governance and management ==
While management information systems can be used at any level of an organization, decisions regarding which systems to implement generally fall to the chief information officer (CIO) and chief technology officer (CTO). These officers are responsible for the overall technology strategy of an organization, including evaluating how new systems can support its objectives.

Once strategic decisions have been made, IT directors—including MIS directors—oversee the technical implementation. Their responsibilities include enforcing relevant policies, ensuring the availability of data and network services, and coordinating the security of organizational data.

Upon implementation, users are granted access to information appropriate to their roles. While data entry into an MIS is commonly performed by non-managerial employees, these individuals rarely have access to the reports and decision-support platforms the system provides to managers.

== Types ==
Management Information Systems are often categorized according to the organizational level they support and the types of decisions they facilitate. These systems range from operational-level transaction systems to strategic-level executive systems.

=== Decision-making levels ===
Organizations are typically structured into three tiers—operational, middle management, and executive—each requiring different types of information and system support.

Operational-level systems primarily handle routine processing and transaction activities. At the middle-management level, systems provide summarized reports and performance metrics to assist managers in monitoring and controlling operations. Strategic-level systems supply externally oriented information to executives for long-term planning and high-level policy decisions.

MIS traditionally serves these levels by transforming raw operational data into structured, periodic reports that aid managerial oversight and support overall performance evaluation.

=== Specific types ===
- Transaction processing systems (TPS) capture and process the routine transactions necessary for day-to-day business operations. They ensure data consistency and accuracy, and serve as the foundational data source for higher-level systems such as MIS and DSS.
- Decision support systems (DSS) are computer-based applications used by middle and senior management to compile information from a wide range of sources in support of problem-solving and decision-making. A DSS is typically employed for semi-structured and unstructured decision problems.
- Executive information systems (EIS), also called executive support systems, are tailored for senior executives and other top-level leaders. An EIS provides rapid access to key performance indicators and high-level summaries of organizational data, enabling strategic decision-making by helping leaders monitor trends and assess overall organizational performance.
- Enterprise resource planning (ERP) systems facilitate the flow of information across core business functions—including finance, supply chain, human resources, and customer service—within an organization, while also managing connections with external stakeholders.
- Supply chain management (SCM) systems enable more efficient coordination of the supply chain by integrating links among suppliers, manufacturers, wholesalers, retailers, and end customers.
- Customer relationship management (CRM) systems manage and analyze customer interactions and data throughout the customer lifecycle, with the aim of improving relationships and enhancing satisfaction.
- Knowledge management systems (KMS) facilitate the collection, organization, retrieval, and dissemination of organizational knowledge, including documents, recorded procedures, and institutional expertise.

== Applications ==
Management information systems are used across a wide range of industries and sectors.

In healthcare, health information systems support clinical decision-making, patient records management, and regulatory compliance. Electronic health records (EHRs) and hospital information systems are common examples of MIS applied in medical settings.

In manufacturing, MIS is used to coordinate production planning, inventory management, quality control, and supply chain logistics. ERP systems are particularly prevalent in this sector, integrating data across the production lifecycle.

Government agencies use MIS for public administration, budgeting, service delivery, and policy analysis. E-government initiatives rely heavily on information systems to improve transparency and citizen access to services.

In education, student information systems track enrollment, academic performance, and institutional resources. Universities also use MIS for research administration and financial planning.

The financial services industry depends on MIS for risk management, regulatory reporting, trading systems, and customer account management. Real-time data processing and analytics are critical in this sector.

In retail, MIS supports point-of-sale systems, inventory tracking, customer analytics, and e-commerce platforms, enabling businesses to respond to consumer demand and optimize supply chains.

== Advantages and disadvantages ==
=== Advantages ===
The following are some of the benefits that can be attained through MIS:

- Improved operational efficiency and support for innovation and new product development.
- Better-informed and faster decision-making through timely access to relevant data.
- Identification of organizational strengths and weaknesses through revenue reports, performance records, and other metrics.
- More effective customer engagement through direct marketing and targeted promotional activities.
- Enhanced competitive advantage through integrated strategic information.

=== Disadvantages ===
Despite its benefits, MIS implementation presents well-documented challenges. High implementation costs, resistance to organizational change, and system integration complexity have contributed to project failures. Studies have shown that a significant percentage of large-scale information systems projects exceed budgets or fail to meet their projected objectives.

Excessive reliance on quantitative data may limit managerial intuition and qualitative judgment. Poorly designed systems can also create information overload, reducing decision effectiveness rather than improving it.

Organizational resistance, insufficient executive sponsorship, and unrealistic expectations have been identified as recurring contributors to implementation challenges. MIS initiatives can also produce unintended consequences, including job displacement, increased employee monitoring, and reduced workplace autonomy.

== Impact of emerging technologies ==
Emerging technologies are reshaping the capabilities and scope of management information systems. Cloud-based MIS platforms offer organizations greater scalability and accessibility, while artificial intelligence (AI)-driven analytics enhance decision-making by enabling the processing of large volumes of data.

The integration of big data analytics into MIS allows organizations to derive insights from both structured and unstructured data sources, including social media, IoT devices, and transactional databases. Machine learning algorithms within MIS platforms increasingly automate forecasting and anomaly detection. The incorporation of predictive analytics has shifted MIS from primarily retrospective reporting toward forward-looking analysis, assisting organizations with demand forecasting, performance optimization, and proactive strategic planning.

Blockchain technology has also been explored for enhancing transparency in supply chain and financial information systems.

Despite these advancements, emerging technologies introduce governance and ethical challenges. AI systems may raise concerns related to algorithmic bias, transparency, and accountability in managerial decision-making. Cloud-based platforms can increase exposure to cybersecurity risks and regulatory compliance burdens, particularly in heavily regulated industries. Organizations must therefore balance technological innovation with effective governance, risk management, and ethical oversight.

== Data governance and security ==
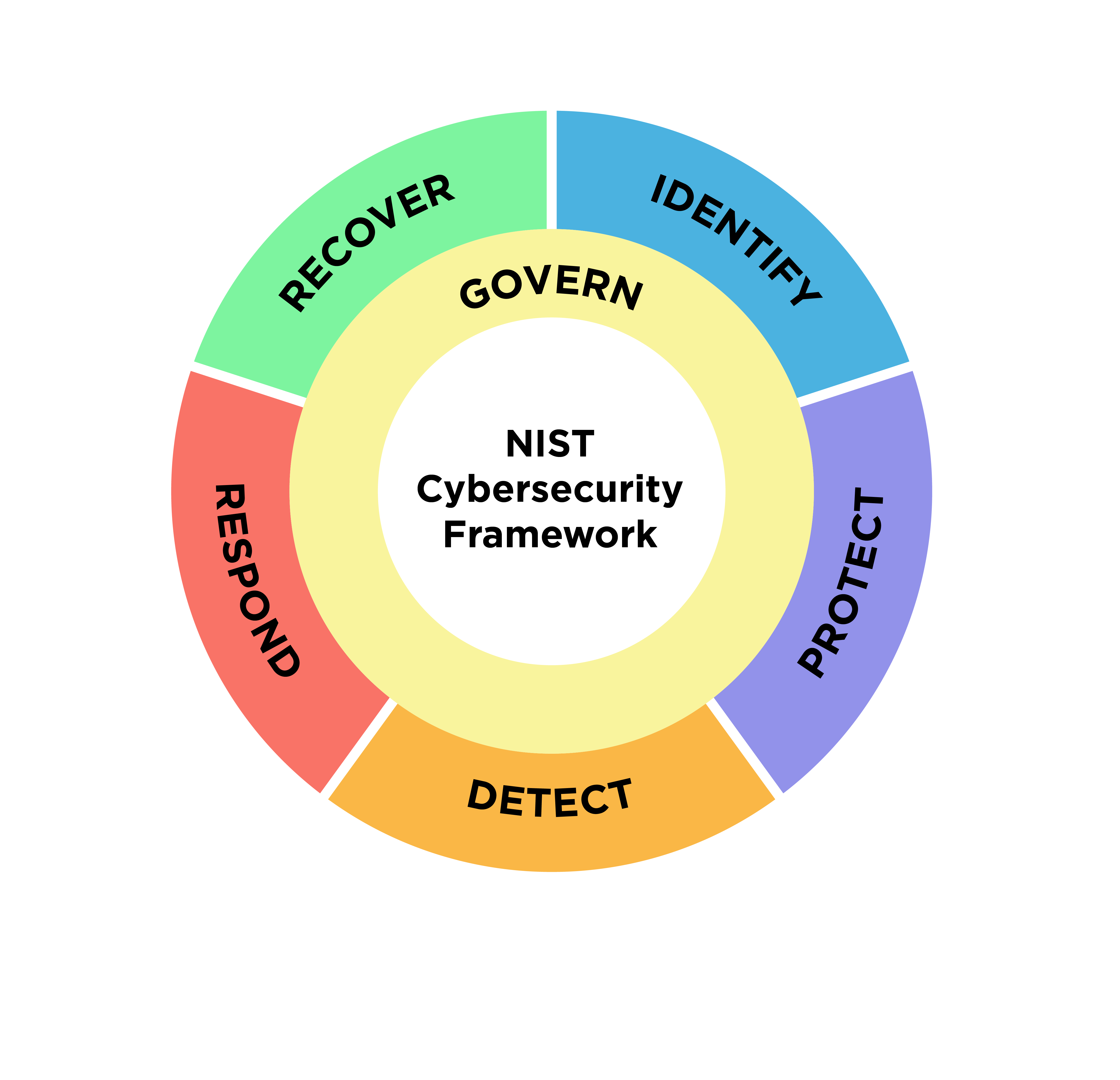
The NIST Cybersecurity Framework outlines core functions supporting risk management and data governance in modern MIS.

As organizations increasingly rely on digital information systems, data governance and security have become central components of MIS. Effective MIS frameworks incorporate policies and procedures that ensure data accuracy, privacy, regulatory compliance, and protection against cybersecurity threats.

Regulatory frameworks such as data protection laws and internal governance structures influence how organizations design and manage their MIS infrastructure. As digital systems grow in complexity, the intersection of data governance, security, and regulatory compliance continues to shape MIS design and implementation across both private and public sectors.

== See also ==
- Business intelligence
- Business performance management
- Corporate governance of information technology
- Datafication
- Data mining
- Enterprise architecture
- Enterprise information system
- Information privacy
- Management by objectives
- Online analytical processing
- Predictive analytics
- Real-time computing
