= Executive information system =

Management support systems

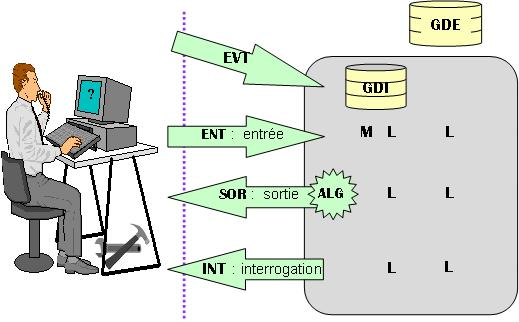
Function Points Schema

An executive information system (EIS), also known as an executive support system (ESS), is a type of management support system that facilitates and supports senior executive information and decision-making needs. It provides easy access to internal and external information relevant to organizational goals. It is commonly considered a specialized form of decision support system (DSS).

EIS emphasizes graphical displays and easy-to-use user interfaces. They offer strong reporting and drill-down capabilities. In general, EIS are enterprise-wide DSS which help top-level executives analyze, compare, and highlight trends in important variables so that they can monitor performance and identify opportunities and problems. EIS and data warehousing technologies are converging in the marketplace.

The term EIS lost popularity in favor of business intelligence (with the sub areas of reporting, analytics, and digital dashboards).

== History ==
Traditionally, executive information systems were mainframe computer-based programs. The purpose was to package a company's data and to provide sales performance or market research statistics for decision makers, such as, marketing directors, chief executive officer, who were not necessarily well acquainted with computers. The objective was to develop computer applications that highlighted information to satisfy senior executives' needs. An EIS typically provides only data that supported executive level decisions, not all company data.

Today, the application of EIS is not only in typical corporate hierarchies, but also at lower corporate levels. As some client service companies adopt the latest enterprise information systems, employees can use their personal computers to gain access to the company's data and identify information relevant to their decision making. This arrangement provides relevant information to upper and lower corporate levels.

== Components ==
EIS components can typically be classified as:

- Hardware
- Software
- User interface
- Telecommunications

=== Hardware ===
When talking about computer hardware for an EIS environment, the focus should be shifted upon the hardware that meets the executive's need. The executive must be put first and the executive's needs must be defined before the hardware can be selected. The basic hardware needed for a typical EIS includes four components:

1. Input data-entry devices. These devices allow the executive to enter, verify, and update data immediately
2. The central processing unit (CPU), which is the most important because it controls the other computer system components
3. Data storage files. The executive can use this part to save useful business information, and this part also helps the executive to search historical business information easily
4. Output devices, which provide a visual or permanent record for the executive to save or read. This device refers to the visual output device such as the monitor or printer

In addition, with the advent of local area networks (LAN), several EIS products for networked workstations became available. These systems require less support and less expensive computer hardware. They also increase EIS information access to more company users.

=== Software ===
Choosing the appropriate software is vital to an effective EIS. Therefore, the software components and how they integrate the data into one system are important. A typical EIS includes four software components:

1. Text: handling software—documents are typically text-based
2. Database: heterogeneous databases on a range of vendor-specific and open computer platforms help executives access both internal and external data
3. Graphic base: graphics can turn volumes of text and statistics into visual information for executives. Typical graphic types are: time series charts, scatter diagrams, maps, motion graphics, sequence charts, and comparison-oriented graphs (i.e., bar charts)
4. Model base—EIS models contain routine and special statistical, financial, and other quantitative analysis

=== User interface ===
An EIS must be efficient to retrieve relevant data for decision makers, so the user interface is very important. Several types of interfaces can be available to the EIS structure, such as scheduled reports, questions/answers, menu driven, command language, natural language, and input/output.

=== Telecommunication ===
As decentralizing is becoming a trend in companies, telecommunications plays a pivotal role in networked information systems. Transmitting data from one place to another has become crucial for establishing a reliable network. In addition, telecommunications within an EIS can accelerate the need for access to distributed data. It can be both by scientific and business means.

== Applications ==
EIS helps executives find data according to user-defined criteria and promote information-based insight and understanding. Unlike a traditional management information system presentation, EIS can distinguish between vital and rarely-used data, and track different key critical activities for executives, both of which are helpful in evaluating if the company is meeting its corporate objectives. After realizing its advantages, people have applied EIS in many areas, especially, in manufacturing, marketing, and finance areas.

=== Manufacturing ===
Manufacturing is the transformation of raw materials into finished goods for sale, or intermediate processes involving the production or finishing of semi-manufactures. It is a large branch of industry and of secondary production. Manufacturing operational control focuses on day-to-day operations, and the central idea of this process is effectiveness.

=== Marketing ===
In an organization, marketing executives' duty is managing available marketing resources to create a more effective future. For this, they need make judgments about risk and uncertainty of a project and its impact on the company in short term and long term. To assist marketing executives in making effective marketing decisions, an EIS can be applied. EIS provides sales forecasting, which can allow the market executive to compare sales forecast with past sales. EIS also offers an approach to product price, which is found in venture analysis. The market executive can evaluate pricing as related to competition along with the relationship of product quality with price charged. In summary, EIS software package enables marketing executives to manipulate the data by looking for trends, performing audits of the sales data, and calculating totals, averages, changes, variances, or ratios.

=== Financial analysis ===
Financial analysis is one of the most important steps to companies today. Executives needs to use financial ratios and cash flow analysis to estimate the trends and make capital investment decisions. An EIS integrates planning or budgeting with control of performance reporting, and it can be extremely helpful to finance executives. EIS focuses on financial performance accountability, and recognizes the importance of cost standards and flexible budgeting in developing the quality of information provided for all executive levels.

== Advantages and disadvantages ==
=== Advantages of ESS ===
- Easy for upper-level executives to use, extensive computer experience is not required in operations
- Provides strong drill-down capabilities to better analyze the given information.
- Information that is provided is better understood
- EIS provides timely delivery of information. Management can make decisions promptly.
- Improves tracking information
- Offers efficiency to decision makers

=== Disadvantages of ESS ===
- System dependent
- Limited functionality, by design
- Information overload for some managers
- Benefits hard to quantify
- High implementation costs
- System may become slow, large, and hard to manage
- Need good internal processes for data management
- May lead to less reliable and less secure data
- Excessive cost for small company

== Future trends ==
This trend frees executives from learning different computer operating systems, and substantially decreases implementation costs. Since this trend includes using existing software applications, executives do not need to learn a new or special language for the EIS package.

Interactive visualizations are trending. 3D visualizations in a VR/AR environment already looks like a possibility. Also, predictive analytics open the doors for (machine) learning what is going to be next based on data from the past. While the data processing can be done in many ways, learning is not completely unsupervised. There is still a good deal of classification using expert personnel analysis. In near realtime scenarios, latencies while doing ML can be a barrier. Optimizing data models, size and processing path/time are ongoing work. As more data is captured at different data stages in not only EIS apps, but also other enterprise apps, audio and video tagging can catalyse data discovery.

== See also ==
- Enterprise performance management
- Enterprise architecture
- Management information system
