= Wil van der Aalst =

Dutch computer scientist and professor

Wil M.P. van der Aalst
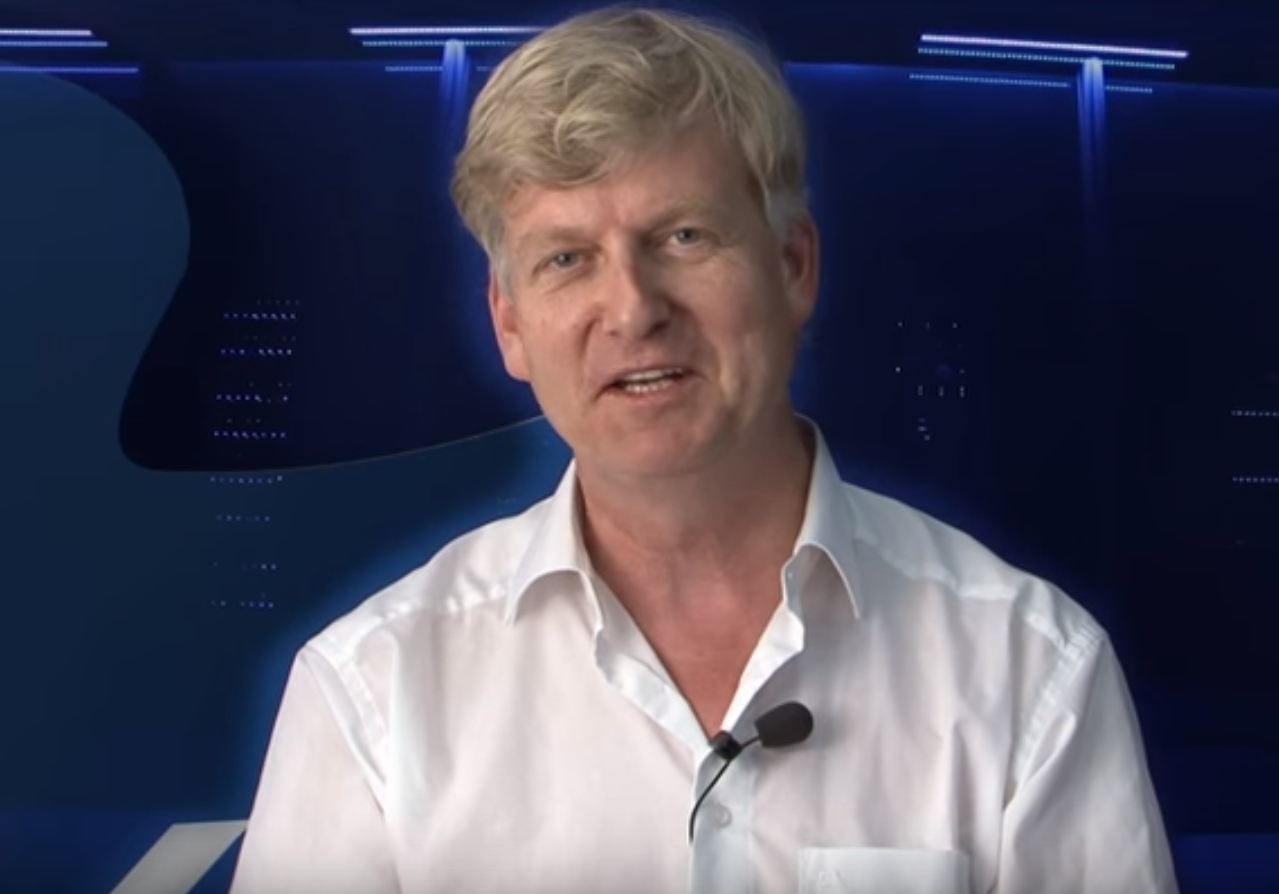
- Wil van der Aalst and the process mining science, 2016
- Born: Willibrordus Martinus Pancratius van der Aalst; 29 January 1966 (age 60); Eersel, North Brabant
- Known for: Workflow patterns, ProM framework, YAWL, software tools such as Declare, Woflan, XRL,
- Scientific career
- Fields: Information systems, Workflow management, Petri nets, Process mining, Specification languages, and Simulation.
- Workplaces: RWTH Aachen University
- Thesis: "Timed colored Petri nets and their application to logistics" (1992)
- Doctoral advisor: Jaap Wessels and Kees van Hee
- Website: http://www.padsweb.rwth-aachen.de/wvdaalst/

Willibrordus Martinus Pancratius van der Aalst (born 29 January 1966) is a Dutch computer scientist and full professor at RWTH Aachen University, leading the Process and Data Science (PADS) group. His research and teaching interests include information systems, workflow management, Petri nets, process mining, specification languages, and simulation. He is also known for his work on workflow patterns.

== Biography and Education ==
Born in Eersel, Netherlands, Van der Aalst received an MSc in computing science in 1988 at the Technische Universiteit Eindhoven (TU/e), and a PhD in mathematics in 1992 with the thesis "Timed colored Petri nets and their application to logistics" under supervision of Jaap Wessels and Kees van Hee.

In 1992 he started working at the Eindhoven University of Technology as an assistant professor for the department of Mathematics and Computing Science, where he headed the Specification and Modeling of Information Systems (SMIS) research group. From 2000 to 2003, he was a part-time full professor at the Computing Science department. And from 2000 to 2006 he was head of the Information Systems department at the Technology Management department of TU/e. Since 2006 he has been full professor at the Department of Mathematics & Computer Science of the Eindhoven University of Technology. He also has a part-time appointment in the BPM group of Queensland University of Technology (QUT).

He has been a visiting professor at Karlsruhe Institute of Technology (AIFB), the University of Georgia (LSDIS), Johann Wolfgang Goethe University Frankfurt am Main (WI-II), the University of Colorado (CTRG), Queensland University of Technology (CITI), Aarhus University (DAIMI), and Fondazione Bruno Kessler (FBK).

He is associate editor for several journals, including "IEEE Transactions on Services Computing", "IEEE Transactions on Industrial Informatics", "International Journal of Business Process Integration and Management", "International Journal on Enterprise Modelling and Information Systems Architectures", "Computers in Industry", and "Transactions on Petri Nets and Other Models of Concurrency".

He is series editor of "Lecture Notes in Business Information Processing" (LNBIP) by Springer, member of the editorial board of "Distributed and Parallel Databases" and "Business and Information Systems Engineering", and member of several steering committees, including "International Conference Series on Business Process Management" (chair), "International Conference Series on Application and Theory of Petri nets" and "International Workshop Series on Web Services and Formal Methods". He is also a member of the Royal Holland Society of Sciences and Humanities (Koninklijke Hollandsche Maatschappij der Wetenschappen) and the Academy of Europe (Academia Europaea). Van der Aalst was elected member of the Royal Netherlands Academy of Arts and Sciences in 2014.

== Work ==
Van der Aalst's research interest is in the fields of information systems, business process management, simulation, Petri nets, process models, workflow management systems, verification techniques, process mining, enterprise resource planning systems, computer supported cooperative work, web services, business process redesign, resource allocation and interorganizational business processes.

He is a strong supporter of open-source software. He initiated and led the development of:

- the ProM framework, a process mining tool
- YAWL, a workflow management system
- and several other software tools including Declare, Woflan, XRL, etc.

He also initiated the workflow patterns initiative. This work influenced industry standards such as the Business Process Execution Language (BPEL), the Business Process Modeling Notation (BPMN), etc. Van der Aalst's ideas have also influenced various widely used commercial software tools such as Flower, Protos, Futura Reflect, Staffware, WebSphere, and ARIS.

Other scientific contributions of Van der Aalst are in the fields of Business Process Discovery, event-driven process chains, the Workflow Management Coalition and XPDL.

Van der Aalst is an ISI Highly Cited researcher. According to Google Scholar he is among the highest ranked computer scientists in the world. See H-index for computer science.

== Publications ==
Van der Aalst has published in total more than 400 books, journal papers, book chapters, conference papers, and reports on these topics. Books, a selection:

- van der Aalst, Wil, and Kees Max Van Hee. Workflow management: models, methods, and systems. MIT press, 2002; 2004.
- Dumas, Marlon, Wil M. van der Aalst, and Arthur H. Ter Hofstede. Process-aware information systems: bridging people and software through process technology. John Wiley & Sons, 2005.
- van der Aalst, Wil. Process mining: discovery, conformance and enhancement of business processes. Springer Science & Business Media, 2011.

Articles, a selection:

- van der Aalst, Wil MP. "The application of Petri nets to workflow management." Journal of circuits, systems, and computers 8.01 (1998): 21–66.
- Wil van der Aalst, Arthur H.M. Hofstede, Bartek Kiepuszewski, and Alistair P. Barros (2003). "Workflow Patterns". In: Distributed and Parallel Databases 14 (1): pp. 5–51. doi:10.1023/A:1022883727209.
- van der Aalst, Wil MP, Arthur HM Ter Hofstede, and Mathias Weske. "Business process management: A survey." Business process management. Springer Berlin Heidelberg, 2003. 1–12.
- van der Aalst, Wil MP, and Arthur HM Ter Hofstede. "YAWL: yet another workflow language." Information systems 30.4 (2005): 245–275.
