= Stef Tijs =

Dutch game theorist (1937–2023)

Stef Tijs (August 31, 1937 – June 13, 2023), or Stephanus Hendrikus Tjis was a Dutch mathematician and a game theory pioneer in the Netherlands. He contributed to most subfields in game theory and particularly in cooperative game theory, where he introduced the Tijs value (later known as the τ value) in 1981 as a solution to n-person games alternative to the Shapley value and others.

== Education and career ==
Tijs was born in Ginneken en Bavel. He studied at Utrecht University for a bachelor's degree in chemistry from 1954 to 1959, later he switched to mathematics, obtaining a MSc degree at the same university in 1963. Tijs was a research assistant in mathematics at Radboud University Nijmegen from 1963 to 1969 and an assistant professor in mathematics there from 1969. He received his PhD in mathematics for work on matrix games from the Radboud University Nijmegen under the supervision of Arnoud van Rooij and Freddy Delbaen (who was younger than Tijs) in 1975. He became an associate professor at Nijmegen in 1975 and gradually built up a Dutch school of game theory there with an international outlook. In 1982, Tijs initiated the game theory seminar in Nijmegen, which later prompted the Netherlands to join the European Meeting on Game Theory (also called SING) that is held annually from 2000. Tijs was promoted to full professor at Radboud University Nijmegen in 1985. In 1991, he moved to Tilburg University, where he became a professor at the Department of Econometrics and Operations Research and the Center of Economic Research. He stayed for the remainder of his career. Between 2003 and 2005, Tijs was also a professor of mathematics at University of Genoa in Italy.

Tijs received an honorary doctorate from the Miguel Hernández University of Elche in 2000. He was a fellow and a council member of the Game Theory Society. He became a Knight of the Order of the Netherlands Lion in 2003.

== Bibliography ==
- Patrone, Fioravante; García-Jurado, Ignacio; Tijs, Stef, eds. (2000). Game Practice: Contributions from Applied Game Theory. Theory and Decision Library. Vol. 23. Boston, MA: Springer US. doi:10.1007/978-1-4615-4627-6. ISBN 978-1-4613-7092-5.
- Tijs, Stef (2003). Introduction to Game Theory. Texts and Readings in Mathematics. Gurgaon: Hindustan Book Agency. doi:10.1007/978-93-86279-17-0. ISBN 978-81-85931-37-1.
- Branzei, Rodica; Dimitrov, Dinko; Tijs, Stef (2008). Models in Cooperative Game Theory. Berlin, Heidelberg: Springer Berlin Heidelberg. doi:10.1007/978-3-540-77954-4. ISBN 978-3-540-77953-7.
