= Valumart =

Valumart or Valuemart may refer to:

- Valu-mart, a Canadian supermarket chain
- Valu-Mart, a defunct U.S. discount retailer
- Valu Mart, a shopping mall in Atterbury, Pretoria, South Africa; see List of shopping centres in South Africa
- Value Mart, an Australian supermarket; see List of supermarket chains in Oceania
- Value Mart, a Malaysian supermarket; see List of supermarket chains in Malaysia
- Value Mart Building, a Mississippi Landmark in the state of Mississippi, U.S.A.

== See also ==
- Value (disambiguation)
- Valu (disambiguation)
- Mart (disambiguation)
