= Value =

Value or values may refer to:

== Ethics and social sciences ==
- Value (ethics), concept which may be construed as treating actions themselves as abstract objects, associating value to them
  - Axiology, interdisciplinary study of values, including ethical values
- Social imaginary, set of morals, institutions, laws, and symbols common to a particular social group
- Religious values, beliefs and practices which a religious adherent partakes in

== Economics ==
- Value (economics), a measure of the benefit that may be gained from goods or service
  - Theory of value (economics), the study of the concept of economic value
  - Value (marketing), the difference between a customer's evaluation of benefits and costs
  - Value investing, an investment paradigm
- Values (heritage), the measure by which the cultural significance of heritage items is assessed
- Present value, value of an expected income stream as of the date of valuation
- Present value of benefits, discounted sum of a stream of benefits associated with a project or proposal

== Business ==
- Business value, forms of value that determine the health and well-being of a firm
- Customer value, economic value received by the end-customer of a product or service
- Employee value, economic value an employee brings to an organization
- Shareholder value, a business term
- Value (marketing), prospective customer's evaluation of the benefits and costs of one product

== Other uses ==
- Data value or datum
- Value, also known as lightness, darkness, or tone, a representation of variation in the perception of a color or color space's brightness
- Value (computer science), an expression that implies no further mathematical processing; a "normal form"
- Value (mathematics), a property such as number assigned to or calculated for a variable, constant or expression
- Value (semiotics), the significance, purpose and/or meaning of a symbol as determined or affected by other symbols
- Note value, the relative duration of a musical note
- Values (political party), a defunct New Zealand environmentalist political party
- "Value" (Atlanta), 2016 TV episode

== See also ==
- Instrumental and intrinsic value
- Value theory, a range of approaches to understanding how, why, and to what degree people value things
- Valu (disambiguation)
