= PVB =

PVB may refer to:

- Palos Verdes blue (Glaucopsyche lygdamus palosverdesensis), a butterfly
- Pemberton Volcanic Belt, a geologic feature in southwestern British Columbia, Canada
- Phong Vũ Buffalo, a professional eSports organization
- Polyvinyl butyral, a type of plastic
- Ponte Vedra Beach, Florida
- Present value of benefits, a term used in project appraisal
- Pressure vacuum breaker
