= Valu =

Valu may refer to:

== People and characters ==
- Asaeli Ai Valu (ヴァル アサエリ愛, Baru Asaeri Ai, born 7 May 1989), Japanese rugby player
- Fakahau Valu (born 1949), Tongan rugby player
- ʻAisake Valu Eke, Tongan politician

=== Characters ===
- Valu, a demon also known as Valac

== Places ==
- Valu Beach, East Timor; a beach

== Groups, companies, organizations ==
- Valu Home Centers, a U.S. hardware store chain
- Value Line (stock ticker VALU), U.S. investment research and financial publisher

== Other uses ==
- Valu (film), a 2008 Indian film
- valu-, an English prefix from Latin; see List of Latin verbs with English derivatives

== See also ==
- "valu", the Samoan language word for the number 8
- Value (disambiguation)
