= Value (marketing) =

Customer's evaluation of a product compared to another

Value in marketing, also known as customer-perceived value, is the difference between a prospective customer's evaluation of the benefits and costs of one product when compared with others. Value may also be expressed as a straightforward relationship between perceived benefits and perceived costs: Value = Benefits - Cost.

The basic underlying concept of value in marketing is human needs. The basic human needs may include food, shelter, belonging, love, and self expression. Both culture and individual personality shape human needs in what is known as wants. When wants are backed by buying power, they become demands.

With a consumers' wants and resources (financial ability), they demand products and services with benefits that add up to the most value and satisfaction.

The four types of value include: functional value, monetary value, social value, and psychological value. The sources of value are not equally important to all consumers. How important a value is, depends on the consumer and the purchase. Values should always be defined through the "eyes" of the consumer:

- Functional value: This type of value is what an offer does, it's the solution an offer provides to the customer.
- Monetary value: This is where the function of the price paid is relative to an offerings perceived worth. This value invites a trade-off between other values and monetary costs.
- Social value: The extent to which owning a product or engaging in a service allows the consumer to connect with others.
- Psychological value: The extent to which a product allows consumers to express themselves or feel better.

For a firm to deliver value to its customers, they must consider what is known as the "total market offering." This includes the reputation of the organization, staff representation, product benefits, and technological characteristics as compared to competitors' market offerings and prices. Value can thus be defined as the relationship of a firm's market offerings to those of its competitors.

Value in marketing can be defined by both qualitative and quantitative measures. On the qualitative side, value is the perceived gain composed of individual's emotional, mental and physical condition plus various social, economic, cultural and environmental factors. On the quantitative side, value is the actual gain measured in terms of financial numbers, percentages, and dollars.

For an organization to deliver value, it has to improve its value : cost ratio. When an organization delivers high value at high price, the perceived value may be low. When it delivers high value at low price, the perceived value may be high. The key to deliver high perceived value is attaching value to each of the individuals or organizations—making them believe that what you are offering is beyond expectation—helping them to solve a problem, offering a solution, giving results, and making them happy.

Value changes based on time, place and people in relation to changing environmental factors. It has been described as an exchange of creative energy between people and organizations in the marketplace.

Very often managers conduct customer value analysis to reveal the company's strengths and weaknesses compared to other competitors. The steps include:

- Identifying the major attributes and benefits that customers value for choosing a product and vendor.
- Assessment of the quantitative importance of the different attributes and benefits.
- Assessment of the company's and competitors' performance on each attribute and benefits.
- Examining how customer in the particular segment rated company against major competitor on each attribute.
- Monitoring customer perceived value over time.
