= List of Latin verbs with English derivatives =

This is a list of Latin verbs with English derivatives and those derivatives.

Ancient orthography did not distinguish between i and j or between u and v. Many modern works distinguish u from v but not i from j. In this article, both distinctions are shown as they are helpful when tracing the origin of English words. See also Latin spelling and pronunciation.

In some Latin verbs, a preposition caused a vowel change in the root of the verb. For example, "capiō" prefixed with "in" becomes "incipio".

Latin verbs
Citation form	Present stem	Perfect stem	Participial stem	Meaning	English derivatives
aceō	ac-	acu-	–	be sour	acescent, acid, acidity, peracid
‡acescō	acesc-	acu-	–	become sour	acescent, acid, acidity, peracid
agō -igō	ag- -ig-	ēg-	āct-	act, drive	abaction, abactor, act, actant, actio, action, actionable, actionary, activate, activation, activator, active, activity, actor, actual, actuality, actuarial, actuary, actuate, actuation, actuator, actuose, agenda, agency, agent, agentive, agible, agile, agility, agitate, agitation, agitative, agitato, agitator, ambages, ambaginous, ambagious, ambiguity, ambiguous, assay, castigate, castigation, coact, coaction, coactive, coagency, coagent, coagment, coagmentation, coagulant, coagulate, coagulation, coagulum, cogency, cogent, cogitability, cogitable, cogitabund, cogitate, cogitation, cogitative, cogitator, compurgation, counteract, counteraction, counteragent, counterreaction, deactivate, deactivation, disambiguate, disambiguation, enact, enactment, enactor, entracte, essay, exact, examen, examine, excogitate, exigency, exigent, expurgate, fumigate, fumigation, inaction, inactive, indagate, indefatigable, inexact, interact, interaction, interactive, interagency, intransigent, litigate, mitigate, navigate, peract, precogitation, proactive, prodigality, prodigence, purgament, purgation, purgative, purgatory, purge, react, reaction, reactionary, reactive, reactor, reagent, redact, redaction, reenact, reenactment, reenactor, reexamine, retroact, retroaction, retroactive, subact, subaction, transact, transaction, transactional, transactivation, transactivator, variegate, variegation
†agitō	agit-	agitav-	agitat-	act, drive	
alō	al- -ol- -ul-	alu-	alit- alt-	nourish	adolescence, adolescent, adult, alible, aliment, alimental, alimentary, alimentation, alimonious, alimony, alma mater, altar, altiloquent, altissimo, altitude, altitudinal, alto, altricial, alumnus, coalesce, coalescence, coalescent, coalite, coalition, coalitional, contralto, exalt, exaltation
‡alescō	alesc- -olesc-		alit-	nourish	adolescence, adolescent, adult, alible, aliment, alimental, alimentary, alimentation, alimonious, alimony, alma mater, altar, altiloquent, altissimo, altitude, altitudinal, alto, altricial, alumnus, coalesce, coalescence, coalescent, coalite, coalition, coalitional, contralto, exalt, exaltation
ambulō	ambul-	ambulav-	ambulat-	walk	amble, ambulance, ambulatory, circumambulation, perambulate, preamble
amō	am-	amav-	amat-	like, love	amateur, amatory, amigo, amorous, enamor, paramour
appello	appell-	appellav-	appellat-	call, address	appeal, appellant, appellate, appellation
apō	ap- api- epi-	ap-	apt- -ept-	fasten	adapt, adaptable, adaptation, adaptative, apt, aptate, aptitude, aptitudinal, attitude, attitudinal, inept, ineptitude, maladaptation
†aptō	apt-	aptav-	aptat-	fasten	adapt, adaptable, adaptation, adaptative, apt, aptate, aptitude, aptitudinal, attitude, attitudinal, inept, ineptitude, maladaptation
ārdeō	ārd-	ārs-	ārs-	be on fire, burn	ardency, ardent, ardor, arson
‡ārdescō	ārdesc-	ārs-	–	be on fire, burn	ardency, ardent, ardor, arson
āreō	ār-	–	–	be dry	arefaction, arid, aridification, aridisol, aridity, semiarid, semiaridity
‡ārescō	āresc-	–	–	be dry	arefaction, arid, aridification, aridisol, aridity, semiarid, semiaridity
arguō	argu-	argu-	argut-	–	arguable, argue, arguendo, arguido, argument, argumentation, argumentative, counterargue, counterargument, inarguable, reargue
†argutō	argut-	-	argutāt-	–	arguable, argue, arguendo, arguido, argument, argumentation, argumentative, counterargue, counterargument, inarguable, reargue
audeō	aud-	aus-	–	be bold, dare	audacious, audacity
audiō	aud-	audīv-	audīt-	hear	audibility, audible, audience, audient, audio, audit, audition, auditive, auditor, auditorium, auditory, clairaudience, clairaudient, disobedience, disobedient, disobey, inaudible, nonobedience, obedience, obedient, obeisance, obey
augeō	aug-	aux-	auct-	increase	auction, auctioneer, auctorial, auctoritas, augend, augment, augmentation, augmentative, august, auteur, author, authoritarian, authoritative, authority, auxiliary, coauthor, multiauthor
†auctō	auct-	-	-	increase	auction, auctioneer, auctorial, auctoritas, augend, augment, augmentation, augmentative, august, auteur, author, authoritarian, authoritative, authority, auxiliary, coauthor, multiauthor
‡augescō	augesc-	-	–	increase	auction, auctioneer, auctorial, auctoritas, augend, augment, augmentation, augmentative, august, auteur, author, authoritarian, authoritative, authority, auxiliary, coauthor, multiauthor
aveō	av-	–	–		avarice, avaricious, avarous, ave, avid, avidity
battuō	battu-	battu-	–	beat	abate, abatement, abattage, abattoir, battalion, battery, battle, battlement, combat, combatant, combative, debatable, debate, embattle, embattlement, noncombat, noncombatant, nondebatable
bibō	bib-	bib-	bibit-	drink	beverage, bib, bibulous, embrue, imbibe, imbrue, imbruement
cadō -cidō	cad- -cid-	cecid-	cas-	fall	accident, accidental, cadaver, cadaverine, cadaverous, cadence, cadent, cadenza, caducous, cascade, case, casual, casualty, casuistry, chance, coincide, coincidence, coincidental, decadence, decadent, decay, deciduous, demicadence, escheat, escheatage, incident, incidental, recidivous, semelincident
caedō	caed- -cid-	cecid-	caes- -cis-	cut	caesura, cement, cementum, chisel, circumcise, circumcision, concise, concision, decide, decision, decisive, deciso, excide, excise, excision, excisional, imprecise, imprecision, incise, incision, incisive, incisor, incisory, incisure, indecision, indecisive, precise, precision, scissors, succise, succision
caleō	cal-	calu-	–	be warm	caldarium, caldera, calefacient, calefaction, calefactive, calefactory, calenture, calescent, calid, calor, calore, calorie, calorifacient, calorific, caudle, cauldron, nonchalance, nonchalant, recalescence, scald
‡calescō	calesc-	calu-	–	be warm	caldarium, caldera, calefacient, calefaction, calefactive, calefactory, calenture, calescent, calid, calor, calore, calorie, calorifacient, calorific, caudle, cauldron, nonchalance, nonchalant, recalescence, scald
canō	can- -cin-	cecin-	cant- -cent-	sing	accent, accentual, accentuate, accentuation, canción, cant, cantabile, cantata, cantation, cantatory, cantatrice, canticle, canticum, cantiga, cantilena, cantion, canto, cantor, cantus, chanson, chansonnier, chant, chanteur, chanteuse, chanticleer, concent, descant, discant, enchant, enchantment, incantation, incantational, incentive, plainchant, precentor, recant, recantation, succentor
†cantō	cant-	cantav-	cantat-	sing	accent, accentual, accentuate, accentuation, canción, cant, cantabile, cantata, cantation, cantatory, cantatrice, canticle, canticum, cantiga, cantilena, cantion, canto, cantor, cantus, chanson, chansonnier, chant, chanteur, chanteuse, chanticleer, concent, descant, discant, enchant, enchantment, incantation, incantational, incentive, plainchant, precentor, recant, recantation, succentor
†cantitō	cantit-	cantitav-	cantitat-	sing	accent, accentual, accentuate, accentuation, canción, cant, cantabile, cantata, cantation, cantatory, cantatrice, canticle, canticum, cantiga, cantilena, cantion, canto, cantor, cantus, chanson, chansonnier, chant, chanteur, chanteuse, chanticleer, concent, descant, discant, enchant, enchantment, incantation, incantational, incentive, plainchant, precentor, recant, recantation, succentor
capiō -cipiō	cap- -cup-	cep- -cip-	capt- -cept-	take	accept, acceptable, acceptance, acceptancy, acceptant, acceptation, accipient, anticipate, anticipation, anticipative, anticipatory, capability, capable, capacious, capacitance, capacitate, capacity, capistrate, capstan, captation, caption, captious, captivate, captivation, captive, captivity, captor, capture, case, catch, catchment, chase, conceit, conceivable, conceive, concept, conceptacle, conceptible, conception, conceptional, conceptive, conceptual, contraception, contraceptive, deceit, deceive, deception, deceptive, discept, disceptation, disceptator, emancipate, except, exceptant, exception, exceptional, exceptive, exceptor, excipient, exciple, excipulum, forceps, imperceptible, incapability, incapable, incapacious, incapacitant, incapacitate, incapacitation, incapacity, incept, inception, inceptive, inceptor, incipience, incipient, inconceivable, intercept, interception, interceptor, intussusception, participant, participate, participial, participle, perceive, percept, perceptible, perception, perceptive, percipience, percipient, precept, preception, preceptive, preceptor, preceptory, preceptress, precipient, prince, principal, principality, recapture, receipt, receive, recept, receptacle, receptible, reception, receptive, receptivity, receptor, receptory, recipe, recipience, recipient, recover, recovery, recuperate, susceptible, susception, susceptive, susceptivity, susceptor, suscipiency, suscipient
†captō	capt- -cept-	captav-	captat- -ceptat-	take	
careō	car-	caru-	carit-	lack	charity, precarious
carpō -cerpō	carp- -cerp-	carps-	carpt- -cerpt-	pick, pluck	carpe diem, decerp, decerpt, decerption, discerp, discerption, excerpt
cassō	cass-	cassav-	cassat-		cassate, cassation
caveō	cav-	cav-	caut-	beware	caution, cautionary, caveat, precaution, precautionary
cēdō	ced-	cess-	cess-	yield, depart	abscess, abscession, accede, access, accessible, accession, accessory, antecedaneous, antecede, antecedent, antecessor, cease, cessation, cessative, cessavit, cession, circumincession, concede, concession, concessionary, decease, decedent, decession, discede, discession, excedent, exceed, excess, excessive, inaccessible, incessable, incessant, intercede, intercession, nonrecessive, precede, precedent, precession, précis, predecease, predecessor, preprocess, preprocessor, procedural, procedure, proceed, process, procession, processionary, processive, processor, recede, recess, recession, recessionary, recessive, reprocess, retrocede, retrocession, retrocessive, secede, secession, succeed, success, succession, successive, successor
†cessō	cess-	cessav-	cessat-	yield, depart	
cēlō -culō	cēl- -cul-	celav-	celat- -cult-	hide	conceal, concealment, occult
cenō	cen-	cenav-	cenat-	dine	cenation, cenatory
ceptō	cept-	ceptav-	ceptat-		discept, disceptation
cernō	cern-	crev-	cret-	separate, sift	decern, decree, discern, discernible, discernment, discrete, excrement, excretion, recrement, secern, secernent, secretion
cieō	ci-	civ-	cit-	–	accite, citation, cite, concitation, concite, excitability, excitable, excitant, excitation, excitative, excite, excitement, incitable, incitant, incitation, incitative, incite, incitement, inexcitable, insouciance, insouciant, irresuscitable, recital, recitation, recitative, recite, resuscitate, resuscitation, solicit, solicitant, solicitation, solicitor, solicitous
†citō	cit-	citav-	citat-	–	accite, citation, cite, concitation, concite, excitability, excitable, excitant, excitation, excitative, excite, excitement, incitable, incitant, incitation, incitative, incite, incitement, inexcitable, insouciance, insouciant, irresuscitable, recital, recitation, recitative, recite, resuscitate, resuscitation, solicit, solicitant, solicitation, solicitor, solicitous
cingō	cing-	cinx-	cinct-	encircle, gird	cincture, succinct
clāmō	clām-	clāmāv-	clāmāt-	call	acclaim, acclamation, clamor, declaim, declamation, declamatory, exclaim, exclamation, exclamatory, proclaim, proclamation, reclaim, reclamation
claudō -clōdō	claud- -clōd-	claus-	claus- -clōs-	close	circumclusion, claudin, clause, claustral, claustration, claustrum, clausula, clausure, cloister, closet, closure, cloture, clusivity, conclude, concludent, conclusion, conclusive, conclusory, disclose, disclosure, disclude, disclusion, eclosion, enclose, enclosure, exclaustration, exclude, exclusion, exclusionary, exclusive, exclusivity, exclusory, foreclose, foreclosure, inclose, inclosure, include, inclusion, inclusionary, inclusive, inclusivity, inconclusive, malocclusion, nondisclosure, nonexclusive, noninclusive, nonocclusion, occlude, occludin, occlusion, occlusive, preclude, preclusion, preclusive, predisclose, predisclosure, reclude, recluse, reclusion, reclusive, reclusory, seclude, seclusion, seclusive, sluice, subclause, supraocclusion, transclusion
clinō	clin-	clināv-	clināt-	lean	declension, declensional, declinable, declinate, declination, decline, disinclination, disincline, inclinable, inclination, incline, reclinable, reclinate, reclination, recline
colō	col- cul-	colu-	colt- cult-	till	acculturate, acculturation, agriculture, apiculture, bicultural, colonial, colony, countercultural, counterculture, crosscultural, cult, cultivable, cultivate, cultivation, cultivator, cultural, culturati, culture, deculturate, deculturation, incult, inculturation, inquiline, inquilinity, inquilinous, intercolonial, intercultural, multicultural, postcolonial, precolonial, subcultural, subculture, superculture
cōnor	con-	conat-	–	try	conation, conative, conatus
consulō	consul-	consulu-	consult-	consult	consigliere, consul, consular, consulate, consult, consultancy, consultant, consultation, consultative, consultor, counsel, counselor, preconsultor, proconsul, proconsular, proconsulate
†consultō	consult-	consultāv-	consultāt-	consult	consigliere, consul, consular, consulate, consult, consultancy, consultant, consultation, consultative, consultor, counsel, counselor, preconsultor, proconsul, proconsular, proconsulate
coquō	coqu-	cox-	coct-	cook	biscotto, biscuit, coctile, coction, concoct, concoction, cook, cookery, cuisine, cuisinier, decoct, decoctible, decoction, excoct, excoction, precocial, precocious, quittor, ricotta, superprecocial
cremō	crem-	cremav-	cremat-	burn	cremate, cremation, crematory, incremate
creō	cre-	creāv-	creāt-	make	accresce, accrescence, accrescent, accrete, accretion, accretionary, accretive, accruable, accrual, accrue, accruement, concrement, concrescence, concrescent, concrete, concretion, concretionary, creant, create, creation, creative, creativity, creator, creature, crescence, crescendo, crescent, crew, critter, croissant, decrease, decrement, decremental, decrescence, decrescendo, decrescent, excrescence, excrescent, inconcrete, increase, increment, incremental, increscence, increscent, procreant, procreate, procreation, procreative, procreator, re-create, recruit, recruitment, surcrew
‡crēscō	crēsc-	crēv-	crēt-	grow	
cubō	cub-	cubu-	cubāt-	lie	accubation, concubinage, concubine, couvade, covey, cubicle, cubiculum, excubitorium, incubate, incubation, incubational, incubator, incubous, incubus, succubine, succubous, succubus
-cumbō	-cumb-	-cubu-	-cubit-	lie	accumb, accumbency, accumbent, decubitus, decumbency, decumbent, discubitory, discumbency, incumbency, incumbent, recumb, recumbence, recumbent, succumb, succumbent
cupiō	cup-	cupiv-	cupit-	desire	concupiscence, concupiscent, covet, covetable, covetous, cupidinous, cupidity
‡cupiscō	cupisc-	cupiv-	cupit-	desire	concupiscence, concupiscent, covet, covetable, covetous, cupidinous, cupidity
currō	curr-	cucurr-	curs-	run	concur, concurrency, concurrent, corsair, courier, course, currency, current, curriculum, cursive, cursor, cursory, curule, decurrent, decursion, discourse, discurrent, discursion, discursive, discursory, discursus, excur, excurrent, excursion, excursive, excursus, extracurricular, incur, incurrent, incursion, incursive, occur, occurrence, occurrent, occursion, parcourse, recourse, recur, recurrent, recursion, recursive, succor, succursal
†cursō	curs-	cursav-	cursat-	run	concur, concurrency, concurrent, corsair, courier, course, currency, current, curriculum, cursive, cursor, cursory, curule, decurrent, decursion, discourse, discurrent, discursion, discursive, discursory, discursus, excur, excurrent, excursion, excursive, excursus, extracurricular, incur, incurrent, incursion, incursive, occur, occurrence, occurrent, occursion, parcourse, recourse, recur, recurrent, recursion, recursive, succor, succursal
dicō	dic-	dicav-	dicat-		dedicate, dedication, preach, predicate
dicō	dic-	dix-	dict-	say	addict, addiction, addictive, contradict, contradiction, contradictive, contradictory, dictate, dictation, dictator, dictatorial, diction, dictionary, dictum, edict, indict, indictment, indite, inditement, predict, prediction, predictive, valediction, valedictorian, valedictory
†dictō	dict-	dictav-	dictat-	say	addict, addiction, addictive, contradict, contradiction, contradictive, contradictory, dictate, dictation, dictator, dictatorial, diction, dictionary, dictum, edict, indict, indictment, indite, inditement, predict, prediction, predictive, valediction, valedictorian, valedictory
dō	d-	ded- -did-	dat- -dit-	give	add, addend, addendum, addition, additional, additive, dative, dedimus, dedition, edition, editor, editorial, extradition, perdition, reddition, redditive, rendition, surrender, tradition, traditional, traditor
doceō	doc-	docu-	doct-	teach	doctor, doctoral, doctrinal, doctrine, document, documentary, documentation, indoctrinate, indoctrination, postdoctoral
doleō	dol-	dolu-	dolit-	grieve	condole, condolence, condolent, dolent, dolente, dolor, dolorific
dormiō	dorm-	dormiv-	dormit-	sleep	dormitory
dubitō (Note: contracted from duo and habitō)	dubit-	dubitāv-	dubitāt-	doubt	dubitable, dubitancy, dubitate, dubitation, dubitative, indubitable, redoubtable
ducō	duc-	dux-	duct-	lead	abduce, abducent, abduction, abductor, adduce, adducent, adduct, adduction, adductor, circumduction, conduce, conducent, conduction, conductive, conductivity, conductor, deduce, deduct, deductible, deduction, deductive, duct, ductile, ductility, ductor, educe, educt, induce, inducement, induct, induction, inductive, inductor, introduce, introduction, introductory, irreducible, nonconductive, produce, product, production, productive, productivity, reduce, reducible, reduction, redux, reintroduction, reproduce, reproduction, reproductive, seduce, seduction, seductive, semiconductor, subduction, superconductivity, superconductor, traduce, traducent, traducian, traduct, traduction
edō	ed-	ed-	es-	eat	edacity, edible, esculent, inedible, obese, obesity
emō -imō	em- -im-	em-	empt-	buy	adempt, ademption, emptor, exempt, exemption, impromptu, nonexempt, preempt, preemption, preemptive, preemptory, prompt, redeem, redemption, redemptive, redemptress, redempture
eō	e-	i-	it-	go	adit, ambient, ambit, ambition, coition, coitus, exeat, exit, intransitive, introit, obituary, preterite, redient, redition, sedition, transient, transit, transition, transitive, transitory
errō	err-	errav-	errat-	stray	errant, errata, erratic, erratum, inerrant
faciō -ficiō	fac- -fic-	fec- -fic-	fact- -fect-	make	affair, affect, affectation, affection, affectional, affectionate, affective, affectivity, aficionado, benefaction, benefactive, benefactor, benefactress, benefic, benefice, beneficence, beneficent, beneficial, beneficiary, beneficiation, biface, bifacial, calefactory, cofactor, cofeature, coinfection, comfit, comfiture, confect, confection, confectionary, confectionery, confecture, confetti, confit, confiture, contrafact, contrafactive, contrafactual, contrafactum, counterfactual, counterfeit, counterfesance, de facto, deface, defacement, defeasance, defeat, defect, defection, defective, defector, deficiency, deficient, deficit, difficile, difficulty, disaffect, disaffection, discomfit, discomfiture, disfeature, disfeaturement, disinfect, disinfectant, disinfection, disqualification, efface, effacement, effect, effectible, effection, effective, effectivity, effector, effectual, effectuality, effectuate, effectuation, efficacious, efficacity, efficacy, efficiency, efficient, enface, enfacement, facade, façade, face, facepalm, faceplant, facet, facette, facial, faciend, facient, facile, facilitate, facilitation, facilitative, facilitator, facilitatory, facility, facinorous, facsimile, fact, faction, factional, factionary, factious, factitious, factitive, factor, factorable, factorial, factory, factotum, factual, facture, facultative, faculty, faitour, fashion, fashionable, feasibility, feasible, feasance, feat, feature, feck, fetish, forfeit, forfeitable, forfeiture, hacienda, imperfect, imperfection, imperfective, indefeasible, ineffective, ineffectual, inefficient, infect, infection, infectious, infective, insufficiency, insufficient, malefaction, malefactor, maleficence, malfeasance, nonfactual, nonfacultative, nonfeasance, nonproficiency, nonprofit, office, official, officiant, officiary, officiate, parfait, perfect, perfectible, perfection, perfective, pluperfect, prefect, prefecture, proficiency, proficient, profit, profiteer, reinfect, remanufacture, resurface, sacrifice, semelfactive, subprefect, subprefecture, subsurface, suffice, sufficiency, sufficient, superficial, superficiality, superficies, surface, surfeit, transfection
†factō	fact- -fect-	factav-	factat- -fectat-	make	
fallō	fall-	fefell-	fals-	deceive, be mistaken, fail	default, fail, failure, fallacious, fallacy, fallibility, fallible, false, falsetto, falsidical, falsifiability, falsifiable, falsification, falsify, falsity, falsum, fault, faux, infallibility, infallible, nonfalsifiable
faveō	fav-	favu-	favit-		disfavor, favor, favorable, favorite
fendō	fend-	fend-	fens- -fest-	strike, hit, push	counterdefense, counteroffensive, defend, defense, defensible, defensive, disinfest, fence, fend, fensible, indefensibility, indefensible, infest, infestation, inoffensive, manifest, manifestation, manifesto, offend, offense, offensive, reinfest, reinfestation, reoffend
feō	fe-	-	fet-	–	effeminate, effete, fawn, fecund, fecundate, fecundation, Fecunditas, fecundity, feminacy, feminine, fetal, fetation, feticidal, feticide, fetiparous, fetus, infecund, infecundity, superfecundation, superfecundity, superfetation
ferō (Note: suppletive)	fer-	tul-	lāt-	bear, bring	ablate, ablation, ablative, ablator, afferent, allative, aquifer, biferous, cf., circumference, circumferential, circumferentor, collate, collation, collatitious, collative, collator, confer, conference, conferential, conferment, conferral, conifer, coniferous, coreference, coreferent, coreferential, correlate, correlation, correlational, correlative, counteroffer, countertransference, cross-correlation, cross-fertile, decorrelation, defer, deference, deferent, deferential, deferment, deferral, delate, delative, dereference, differ, difference, different, differentia, differentiability, differentiable, differential, differentiate, differentiation, differentiator, dilatory, efference, efferent, elate, elation, elative, equidifferent, fertile, fertility, fortuitous, fortuity, fortunate, fortune, illation, illative, indifference, indifferent, inelative, infer, inferable, inference, inferential, infertile, infertility, insufferable, interconference, interfere, interference, interrelate, interrelation, intraconference, lative, Lucifer, multiferous, nonconference, nonillative, noninterference, nontransference, oblate, oblation, offer, offertory, perlative, postelative, prefer, preferable, preference, preferential, preferment, prelacy, prelate, prelature, prolate, prolation, prolative, proliferous, refer, referee, reference, referendary, referendum, referent, referential, referral, relate, relation, relational, relative, relativity, relator, relatrix, relatum, retransfer, rotifer, semi-differentiability, semi-differentiable, subfertility, sublative, subrelation, suffer, sufferable, sufferance, superlative, transfer, transferability, transferable, transference, transferral, translation, translational, translatitious, translative, translator, vociferate
ferveō	ferv-	–	–	–	defervescence, effervesce, effervescence, effervescent, ferment, fermentation, fervency, fervent, fervescent, fervid, fervor, pre-ferment, perfervid
‡fervescō	fervesc-	–	–	–	defervescence, effervesce, effervescence, effervescent, ferment, fermentation, fervency, fervent, fervescent, fervid, fervor, pre-ferment, perfervid
fīgō	fīg-	fīx-	fix-	fix	affix, affixation, affixion, antefix, circumfix, circumfixation, crucifix, crucifixion, disfix, fix, fixable, fixate, fixation, fixative, fixity, fixure, infix, infixion, interfix, postfix, prefix, prefixion, simulfix, soffit, subfix, suffix, suffixion, suprafix, transfix, transfixion
findō	find-	fid-	fiss-	cleave, split	bifid, contrafissure, decemfid, diffind, diffission, fissile, fission, fissiped, fissure, fistula, fistular, fistulose, multifid, multifistular, quadrifid, quinquefid, trifid
fingō	fing-	finx-	fict-	fashion, invent	effigy, fiction, fictional, fictive, figment, figurado, figural, figurant, figurate, figuration, figurative, figure, figurine, nonfiction, nonfictional, reconfiguration, reconfigure, refigure, superfiction, transfiguration, transfigure, transfigurement
fiō	fi-	–	–	be made	fiat
flectō	flect-	flex-	flex-	bend	deflect, flexibility, flexible, flexile, flexion, flexor, flexuose, flexure, genuflect, inflect, inflection, inflexible, irreflexive, reflect, reflective, reflector, reflex, reflexion, reflexive, retroreflector
fligō	flig-	flix-	flict-	strike	afflict, affliction, afflictive, conflict, confliction, inflict, infliction, inflictive, profligate
flō	fl-	flav-	flat-	blow	afflation, afflatus, conflate, conflation, deflate, deflation, efflate, efflation, exsufflate, exsufflation, flabellum, flabile, flatulence, flatulent, inflate, inflation, insufflate, insufflation, soufflé, sufflate, sufflation
fluō	flu-	flux-	flux-	flow	affluence, affluent, confluence, diffluence, effluent, efflux, fluency, fluent, fluid, flume, flux, fluxion, influence, influenza, influx, reflux
fodiō	fod-	fod-	foss-	dig	effodient, effossion, fodient, fossa, fossarian, fosse, fossette, fossil, fossiliferous, fossor, fossorial, fossula, fossulate, semifossorial, subfossil, subfossorial
for	fā-	fāt-	–	say, speak	affability, affable, bifarious, confabulate, confabulation, defamation, defamatory, defame, effable, fable, fabular, fabulous, facund, facundious, facundity, famacide, fame, famosity, famous, fanatic, fatal, fatality, fate, fatidic, fatiferous, fetial, ineffability, ineffable, infamous, infamy, infancy, infant, infanticide, infantile, infantry, nefand, nefandous, nefarious, nonfatal, omnifarious, preface, prefatory
forō	for-	forāv-	forāt-	bore	biforate, foramen, foraminate, foraminifer, imperforate, perforate, perforation, transforate
frangō -fringō	frang- -fring-	freg-	fract-	break	birefringence, diffract, diffraction, fractal, fraction, fractional, fracture, fragile, fragility, fragment, fragmentary, frail, infraction, infringe, irrefrangible, refraction, refractive, refractor, refractory, refrain, refrangible, refringent, suffrage
fricō	fric-	fricu-	frict- fricāt-	rub	affricate, affrication, affricative, confrication, fray, frication, fricative, friction, frictional
frīgeō	frīg-	–	–	be cold	frigescent, frigid, frigidarium, frigidity, frigorific, frisson, sangfroid
‡frīgēscō	frīgēsc-	frīx-	–	be cold	frigescent, frigid, frigidarium, frigidity, frigorific, frisson, sangfroid
frigerō	friger-	–	–		refrigerant, refrigerate, refrigeration, refrigerator
frigō	frig-	frix-	frict-	parch	fritter, fry
friō	fri-	friāv-	friāt-	–	friability, friable, friation
fruor	fru-	fruct-	–	enjoy	fructuary, fructuous, fructus, fruition, infructescence, infructuose, usufruct, usufructuary
fucō	fuc-	fucāv-	fucāt-	–	fucate, infucate, infucation
fugiō	fug-	fug-	fugit-	flee	centrifugal, centrifugation, centrifuge, fugacious, fugacity, fugal, fugato, fugitive, fugue, refuge, refugee, subterfuge, transfuge
†fugitō	fugit-	fugitāv-	fugitāt-	flee	centrifugal, centrifugation, centrifuge, fugacious, fugacity, fugal, fugato, fugitive, fugue, refuge, refugee, subterfuge, transfuge
fulciō	fulc-	fuls-	fult-	–	fulcrum
fulgeō	fulg-	fuls-	–	flash	effulgence, effulgent, foudroyant, fulgency, fulgent, fulgid, fulgor, fulminant, fulminate, fulmination
‡fulgescō	fulgesc-	–	–		
fundō	fund-	fūd-	fūs-	pour	affusion, circumfuse, circumfusion, confound, confuse, confusion, diffuse, diffusion, diffusive, diffusivity, diffusor, effund, effuse, effusion, effusive, foison, fondant, fondue, found, foundry, funnel, fuse, fusibility, fusible, fusile, fusion, futile, futility, infound, infundibular, infundibuliform, infundibulum, infuse, infusion, infusive, infusoria, infusorian, interfuse, interfusion, nonfusible, nonrefundable, perfuse, perfusion, perfusive, profuse, profusion, profusive, refund, refundable, refusal, refuse, suffuse, suffusion, suffusive, transfund, transfuse, transfusion, transfusive
fungor	fung-	funct-	–	do	bifunctional, bifunctor, cofunctor, defunct, defunction, defunctive, function, functional, functionality, functionary, functor, fungibility, fungible, malfunction, multifunctional, multifunctor, nonfunctional, nonfungible, perfunctory
-fūtō	fut-	futāv-	futāt-	–	confute, irrefutable, refutation, refute
garriō	garr-	garriv-	garrit-	–	garrulity, garrulous
gaudeō	gaud-	gavis-	–	rejoice	enjoy, enjoyment, gaud, gaudery, gaudioso, gaudy, joy, rejoice
gerō	ger-	gess-	gest- -gist-	carry	agger, congeries, congest, congestion, congestive, contragestive, contrasuggestible, countersuggestion, decongest, decongestant, decongestion, decongestive, deregister, deregistration, digest, digestible, digestion, digestive, digestor, egest, egesta, egestion, egestive, enregister, exaggerate, exaggeration, gerund, gerundial, gerundival, gerundive, gest, gestant, gestate, gestation, gestational, gestative, gestatory, gestic, gesticulant, gesticular, gesticulate, gesticulation, gestural, gesture, indigestible, indigestion, ingest, ingestant, ingestible, ingestion, ingestive, jest, nonregistrant, preregister, preregistration, regest, register, registrable, registrant, registrar, registrary, registration, registry, reregister, suggest, suggestibility, suggestible, suggestion, suggestive, verbigeration, vicegerent
†gestō	gest-	gestāv-	gestāt-	carry	
gignō	gign-	genu-	genit-	give birth, produce; cause	congenial, congeniality, congenital, disingenuous, engine, engineer, genial, geniality, genie, genital, genitor, geniture, genius, genuine, indigene, indigenous, ingenious, ingénue, ingenuity, ingenuous, multiengine, nongenuine, primogeniture, progenitor, ultimogeniture
gradior -gredior	gradi- -gredi-	gress- -gress-	–	step	aggression, aggressive, aggressor, congress, congression, congressional, congressive, counteraggression, digress, digression, digressive, egress, egression, egressive, gradient, ingredient, ingress, ingressive, introgression, introgressive, nonaggression, progress, progression, progressive, progressivity, regress, regression, regressive, regressivity, regressor, retrogressive, transgress, transgression, transgressive, transgressor
†grassor	grass-	grassāt-	–	step	aggression, aggressive, aggressor, congress, congression, congressional, congressive, counteraggression, digress, digression, digressive, egress, egression, egressive, gradient, ingredient, ingress, ingressive, introgression, introgressive, nonaggression, progress, progression, progressive, progressivity, regress, regression, regressive, regressivity, regressor, retrogressive, transgress, transgression, transgressive, transgressor
gruō	gru-	gru-	–	–	congrue, congruence, congruent, congruity, congruous, incongruent, incongruity, incongruous
gustō	gust-	gustāv-	gustāt-	taste	degust, degustate, degustation, gustation, gustative, gustatory
habeō -hibeō	habe- -hibe-	habu-	habit- -hibit-	have	ability, able, debit, debitor, debt, debtor, devoir, disability, disable, due, duty, enable, endeavor, exhibit, exhibition, exhibitor, habeas corpus, habile, habilitate, hability, habit, habitable, habitance, habitant, habitat, habitation, habitator, habitual, habituate, habituation, habitude, habitudinal, inability, indubitable, inhabile, inhabit, inhabitable, inhabitant, inhabitation, inhibit, inhibition, inhibitory, prebend, prebendary, prohibit, prohibition, prohibitive, prohibitory, provender, rehabilitant, rehabilitate, rehabilitation, rehabilitative, rehabilitator
†habitō	habit-	habitāv-	habitāt-	have	
habitūriō	habitūr-	-	-	have	
haereō	haer-	haes-	haes-	cling, stick	adhere, adherence, adherend, adherent, adhesion, adhesive, cohere, coherence, coherent, cohesion, cohesive, decoherence, hesitancy, hesitant, hesitate, hesitation, hesitator, incoherency, incoherent, inhere, inherency, inherent, inhesion, nonadherence, nonadherent, nonadhesive, quasicoherent
†haesitō	haesit-	haesitāv-	haesitāt-	cling, stick	adhere, adherence, adherend, adherent, adhesion, adhesive, cohere, coherence, coherent, cohesion, cohesive, decoherence, hesitancy, hesitant, hesitate, hesitation, hesitator, incoherency, incoherent, inhere, inherency, inherent, inhesion, nonadherence, nonadherent, nonadhesive, quasicoherent
‡haerescō	haeresc-	-	–	cling, stick	adhere, adherence, adherend, adherent, adhesion, adhesive, cohere, coherence, coherent, cohesion, cohesive, decoherence, hesitancy, hesitant, hesitate, hesitation, hesitator, incoherency, incoherent, inhere, inherency, inherent, inhesion, nonadherence, nonadherent, nonadhesive, quasicoherent
halō	hal- -hel-	halāv-	halāt-	breathe	anhelation, anhele, anhelous, exhalable, exhalant, exhalation, exhale, halitus, inhalant, inhalation, inhale
hauriō	hauri-	haus-	haust-	draw	exhaust, exhaustible, exhaustion, exhaustive, hauriant, haurient, haustellate, haustellum, haustorium, haustrum, inexhaustible, nonexhaustive
hiō	hi-	hiāv-	hiāt-	gape	dehisce, dehiscence, dehiscent, hiatal, hiatus, indehiscence, indehiscent, inhiation
‡hiscō	hisc-	–	–	gape	dehisce, dehiscence, dehiscent, hiatal, hiatus, indehiscence, indehiscent, inhiation
iaceō	iac-	iacu-	jacit-	be thrown, lie	adjacent, circumjacent, nonadjacent, subjacent, superjacent
iaciō -iciō	iac-	iec- (j)ic-	jact- -ject-	throw	abject, adjectival, adjective, conjectural, conjecture, deject, dejection, disject, disjection, ejaculate, ejaculation, ejaculatory, eject, ejecta, ejection, ejective, ejectment, ejector, inject, injection, injective, injector, interject, interjection, interjectional, interjector, interjectory, introject, introjection, introjective, jactation, jactitation, jaculate, jaculation, jaculator, jaculatory, jaculiferous, jet, jetsam, jettison, jetty, jut, jutty, nonobjective, object, objectification, objection, objectionable, objective, objectivity, objector, parget, project, projectile, projection, projective, projector, reject, rejectamenta, rejection, subject, subjection, subjective, subjectivity, subjicible, surjection, surjective, traject, trajectile, trajection, trajectory, trijet
†jactō	jact- -ject-	–	jactāt-	throw	
†jactitō	jactit-	–	jactitāt-	throw	
īciō, īcō	īc-	īc-	īct-	strike	ictal, ictic, ictus, interictal, postictal
irāscor (Note: deponent)	irāsc-	irāt-	–	be angry	irascible, irate
iungō	iung-	īunx-	īunct-	join	join
juvō	juv-	juv-	jut-	help	adjument, adjutant, adjutor, adjutory, adjutrix, coadjutant, coadjutor, injucundity, jocund, jocundity
†jutō	jut-	-	-	help	adjument, adjutant, adjutor, adjutory, adjutrix, coadjutant, coadjutor, injucundity, jocund, jocundity
labor (Note: deponent)	lāb-	lāps-	–	slide, slip	antelapsarian, collapse, collapsible, elapse, illapse, infralapsarian, labile, lability, lapsarian, lapse, postlapsarian, prelapsarian, prolapse, relapse, sublapsarian, supralapsarian
†lapsō	laps-	–	–	slide, slip	antelapsarian, collapse, collapsible, elapse, illapse, infralapsarian, labile, lability, lapsarian, lapse, postlapsarian, prelapsarian, prolapse, relapse, sublapsarian, supralapsarian
laciō -liciō	lac- -lic-	-licu-	– -lect-	lure	allect, allectation, alliciency, allicient, delectable, delectation, delicious, delight, dilettante, elicit, illicit, illicium, lace
†lectō	lect-	lectāv-	lectāt-	lure	allect, allectation, alliciency, allicient, delectable, delectation, delicious, delight, dilettante, elicit, illicit, illicium, lace
laedō -lidō	laed- -lid-	laes- -lis-	laes- -lis-	hurt	allision, collide, collision, contralesional, elide, elidible, elision, illesive, ipsilesional, lesion, lesional
langueō	langu-	–	–		languid, languish, languor
lateō	late-	latu-	–	lay hidden	latent, latency, latescent
laudō	laud-	laudāv-	laudāt-	praise	illaudable, laud, laudable, laudanum, laudation, laudator, laudatory, lauds
lavō	lav-	lav-	laut-, lot-	wash	latrine, lavatory, loment, lotion, loture
lēgō	lēg-	legav-	legat-	send	allege, delegate, delegation, relegation
legō -ligō	leg- -lig-	leg-	lect-	choose, gather, read	collect, collectible, collection, collective, collector, diligence, diligent, elect, election, elective, elector, eligibility, eligible, illegible, ineligible, lectionary, lector, lecture, legend, legendary, legible, neglect, negligence, negligent, select, selection, selective, selector
deleō	delē- del-	delēv-	delēt-	delete, erase	delete, deletion, delible, indelible
libō	lib-	libav-	libat-	pour	libament, libation
libō	lib-	–	libit-	please	libido
liceō	lic-	-	licit-	–	licence, licit, licitation
†licitō	licit-	licitav-	licitat-	–	licence, licit, licitation
ligō	lig-	ligav-	ligat-	bind	ligament, ligature, obligation
linquō	linqu-	liqu-	lict-	abandon	delict, delinquent, derelict, dereliction, relict, reliction, relinquish, reliquary
liveō	liv-	–	–		livid, livor
locō	loc-	locav-	locat-	place, put	allocate, allocation, collocate, collocation, locate, location, locational, locative, locator, relocate, relocation
loquor	loqu-	locūt-	–	speak	allocution, allocutive, circumlocution, collocution, collocutor, colloquial, colloquium, colloquy, elocutio, elocution, eloquence, eloquent, grandiloquent, illocution, interlocutor, interlocutory, locution, loquacious, loquacity, loquitur, oblocutor, obloquy, perlocutionary, ventriloquy
luceō	luc-	lux-	–	be light, shine	lucent, pellucid
luctor	luct-	luctat-	–	wrestle	reluctance, reluctant
lūdō	lūd-	lūs-	lūs-	play	allude, allusion, allusive, collude, collusion, collusive, delude, delusion, delusional, delusive, delusory, disillusion, elude, elusion, elusive, illude, illusion, illusive, illusory, interlude, ludicrous, prelude
luō	lu-	lu-	lut-	wash	abluent, ablution, dilute, elution, pollution
maneō	man-	mans-	mans-	stay	immanence, immanent, impermanence, impermanent, maisonette, manor, manorial, manse, mansion, ménage, menagerie, menial, meiny, messuage, nonpermanence, nonpermanent, permanence, permanent, quasipermanent, remain, remainder, remanence, remanent, remnant, semipermanent
mānō	mān-	mānāv-	mānāt-	flow	emanant, emanate, emanation, immanation
meō	me-	meāv-	meāt-	go, pass	immeability, impermeability, impermeable, interpermeate, irremeable, meatal, meatus, permeability, permeable, permeance, permeant, permease, permeate, permeation, semipermeable, suprameatal
mergō	merg-	mers-	mers-	dip	demerge, demersal, demerse, demersion, emerge, emergence, emergency, emergent, emersion, immerge, immergence, immerse, immersible, immersion, immersive, merge, reemerge, reemergence, reimmerse, submerge, submergence, submerse, submersible, submersion
migrō	migr-	migrāv-	migrāt-		countermigration, emigrant, emigrate, emigration, émigré, immigrant, immigrate, immigration, migrant, migrate, migration, migrational, migratory, nonmigratory, remigrant, remigrate, remigration, transmigrant, transmigrate, transmigration, transmigratory
minuō	minu-	minu-	minūt-	lessen	comminute, comminution, comminutor, diminish, diminishment, diminuendo, diminution, diminutive, émincé, menu, mince, minuend, minute, minutiae
misceō	misc-	miscu-	mixt-	mix	admix, admixtion, admixture, commix, commixture, immiscibility, immiscible, immix, immixture, intermix, intermixture, maslin, meddle, mestizo, Métis, miscellanea, miscellaneous, miscellany, miscibility, miscible, mix, mixture, permiscible, permix, permixtion, postmix, premix, promiscuity, promiscuous, remix
mittō	mitt-	mīs-	miss-	send	admissibility, admissible, admission, admissive, admit, commissar, commissariat, commissary, commission, commissure, commit, commitment, committal, committee, compromise, decommission, decommit, demise, demiss, demit, dismiss, dismissal, dismissive, emissary, emission, emissitious, emissive, emissivity, emit, emittent, impermissible, inadmissible, intermission, intermittent, intromissible, intromission, intromissive, intromit, intromittent, manumission, manumit, mess, message, messenger, missile, mission, missionary, missive, mittimus, noncommittal, omission, omit, permissible, permission, permissive, permit, permittee, premise, premiss, premit, pretermission, pretermit, promise, promissive, promissory, readmission, readmit, recommit, remise, remiss, remissible, remission, remissive, remissory, remit, remittal, remittance, remittee, remittence, remittent, remittitur, retransmission, retransmit, subcommittee, submission, submissive, submit, surmise, transmissibility, transmissible, transmission, transmissive, transmit
molō	mol-	molu-	molit-	grind	demolition, emolument, molar
moneō	mon-	monu-	monit-	warn	admonish, admonition, admonitory, monition, monitor, monitory, monument, monumental, premonition
monstrō	monstr-	monstrav-	monstrat-	show	demonstrable, demonstrant, demonstrate, demonstration, demonstrative, demonstrator, demonstratory, remonstrant, remonstrate, remonstration, remonstrative
moveō	mov-	mōv-	mōt-	move	admove, amotion, amove, bimotor, cocommutator, commotion, commove, commutable, commutation, commutative, commutativity, commutator, commute, countermotion, countermove, countermovement, demote, demotion, emotion, emotional, emotive, emotivity, emove, equimomental, immobile, immutable, immutation, immute, incommutable, locomotion, locomotive, mobile, mobility, molt, moment, momental, momentaneous, momentary, momentous, momentum, motation, motif, motile, motility, motion, motional, motivate, motivation, motivational, motivator, motive, motor, moult, movant, move, movement, movent, mutability, mutable, mutate, mutation, mutineer, mutinous, mutiny, mutual, mutuality, noncommutative, noncommutativity, nonmotile, nonmotility, nonmutual, pari-mutuel, permutable, permutate, permutation, permutational, permute, promote, promotion, promotional, promotive, promotor, promove, remote, remotion, removal, remove, subpermutation, transmove, transmutable, transmutate, transmutation, transmute, transmutual, trimotor
†mōtō	mōt-	motāv-	motāt-	move	
†mūtō	mūt-	mutāv-	mutāt-	move	
narrō (Note: Contracted from gnārus and agō)	narr-	narrāv-	narrāt-	tell	counternarrative, narration, narrative, narrator
nascor	nāsc-	nat- gnat-	–	be born	adnascent, adnate, adnation, agnate, agnatic, agnation, binational, cognate, cognation, connascence, connascent, connate, connation, connatural, denature, enascent, enate, enation, impregnate, innate, international, multinational, nada, naïf, naissant, naïve, nascency, nascent, natal, natality, nation, national, nationality, native, nativity, natural, naturality, nature, née, nonnative, postnatal, pregnancy, pregnant, prenatal, preternatural, renaissance, renaissant, renascence, renascent, renature, subnational, supernatural, supranational, transnational, transnationality
natō	nat-	natav-	natat-	float, swim	natatorium
necō	nec-	necāv-	necāt-	kill	enecate, internecine
nectō	nect-	nexu-	nex-	join, tie	adnexum, annectent, annex, annexation, annexion, connect, connexion, deannexation, disconnect, interconnect, nexus, reconnect
nōscō -gnōscō	nōsc- -gnōsc-	nosc-	nōt- -gnōt-, -gnit-	know	acquaint, acquaintance, agnition, agnize, cognition, cognitive, ignoble, nobility, noble, notice, notion, recognition, reconnaissance, reconnoiter
notō	not-	notāv-	notāt-	mark	annotation, annotator, connotation, connotational, connotative, connote, denotation, denotational, denotative, denotatum, denote, nondenotative, nonnotable, nonnotational, notability, notable, notary, notate, notation, notational
nuntiō	nunt-	nuntiav-	nuntiat-	bring news of, announce	announce, annunciation, denunciation, renounce, renunciation
nutriō	nutr-	nutriv-	nutrit-	nourish	innutrition, malnourish, malnourishment, malnutrition, nonnutritional, nourish, nourishment, nurse, nurturance, nurture, nutrient, nutriment, nutrition, nutritional, nutritious
ōdi	od-	–	–	hate	annoy, annoyance, ennui, odious, odium
oleō	ol-	olu-	–	smell	olfactory, olid, redolence, redolent
operiō	oper-	operu-	opert-	cover	cover, covert, curfew, discover, discovert, discoverture, discovery, operculum, rediscover
optō	opt-	optav-	optat-	choose	adopt, adoptive, coopt, cooptation, opt, optation, optative
ordior	ord-	ors-	–	begin	exordium, primordial, primordium
orior	ori-	ort-	–	rise	abort, abortion, abortive, disorient, disorientation, orient, oriental, orientation
palleō	pall-	pallu-	–	be pale	pallid, pallor
pandō	pand- -pend-	pand-	pans- -pess-	spread	compass, dispand, dispansion, encompass, expand, expanse, expansion, expansive, pace, repand
pangō -pingō	pang- -ping-	pepig-	pact-	fasten	compact, compaction, compactor, compinge, counterpropaganda, impact, impaction, impactive, impinge, impingement, propaganda, propagate, propagation
pareō	par-	paru-	parit-	be ready	apparent, apparition, appear, appearance, disappear, disappearance, disparition, semitransparent, transparency, transparent
pariō	par- -per-	peper-	part- -pert-		antepartum, biparous, deiparous, fissiparity, multiparous, nonparental, nullipara, nulliparity, nulliparous, oviparity, oviparous, parent, parental, parity, parturiency, parturient, parturifacient, parturition, pluriparous, postpartum, primipara, primiparous, repertoire, repertory, semelparity, semelparous, uniparous, vivipary, viviparous
parturiō	partur-	parturiv-	parturit-		antepartum, biparous, deiparous, fissiparity, multiparous, nonparental, nullipara, nulliparity, nulliparous, oviparity, oviparous, parent, parental, parity, parturiency, parturient, parturifacient, parturition, pluriparous, postpartum, primipara, primiparous, repertoire, repertory, semelparity, semelparous, uniparous, vivipary, viviparous
parō	par- -per-	parav- -perav-	parat- -perat-	make ready	apparat, apparatus, disparate, disrepair, dissever, disseverance, emperor, empery, empire, empress, imperant, imperative, imperator, imperious, inseparable, irreparable, parade, pare, parry, preparation, preparative, preparatory, prepare, repair, reparable, reparation, reparative, separable, separate, separation, separator, sever, severable, several, severance
pascō	pasc-	pav-	past-	feed	antepast, antipasto, pastern, pastor, pastorage, pastoral, pastorale, pastorate, pastorium, pasturage, pastural, pasture, repast, repasture
pateō	pat-	patu-	–	be open	patefaction, patella, patellar, patelliform, patency, patent
patior	pat-	pass-	–	endure	compassion, compassionate, compatibility, compatible, dispassion, dispassionate, impassion, impassive, impassivity, impatience, impatient, incompatibility, incompatible, noncompatible, passion, passionate, passive, passivity, patience, patient
paveō	pav-	pav-	–	be afraid	pavid, pavidity
paviō	pav-	paviv-	pavit-	beat	pave, pavement, paviage, pavior
-pellō	-pell-	-pellav-	-pellat-		appeal, appellable, appellant, appellate, appellation, appellative, repeal
pellō	pell-	pepul-	puls-	push	appulse, appulsion, appulsive, compel, compulsatory, compulsion, compulsive, compulsivity, compulsory, depulse, depulsion, dispel, expel, expellent, expulsion, impel, impellent, impulse, impulsion, impulsive, impulsor, nonpropulsive, propel, propellent, propulsion, propulsive, pulsate, pulsatile, pulsation, pulsative, pulsator, pulse, pulsion, push, repel, repulse, repulsion, repulsive, repulsory
†pulsō	puls-	pulsav-	pulsat-	push	appulse, appulsion, appulsive, compel, compulsatory, compulsion, compulsive, compulsivity, compulsory, depulse, depulsion, dispel, expel, expellent, expulsion, impel, impellent, impulse, impulsion, impulsive, impulsor, nonpropulsive, propel, propellent, propulsion, propulsive, pulsate, pulsatile, pulsation, pulsative, pulsator, pulse, pulsion, push, repel, repulse, repulsion, repulsive, repulsory
pendeō	pend-	pepend-	–	be hanging, hang (intrans.)	antependium, codependency, codependent, depend, dependable, dependency, dependent, impend, impendency, impendent, independence, independent, interdependent, lis pendens, penchant, pendency, pendent, pendente lite, pendulous, pendulum, pensile, propend, propendency, propendent, propense, propension, propensity
pendō	pend-	pepend-	pens-	weigh	compendious, compendium, compensate, compensation, compensatory, dispensation, dispense, expend, expense, pensative, pension, pensive, poise, suspense
†pensō	pens-	pensav-	pensat-	weigh	compendious, compendium, compensate, compensation, compensatory, dispensation, dispense, expend, expense, pensative, pension, pensive, poise, suspense
perior	per-	–	–		experience, experiment, inexperience, peril
petō	pet-	petiv-	petit-	seek, attack	appete, appetence, appetent, appetite, appetition, centripetal, compete, competence, competent, competition, competitive, competitor, impetuous, impetus, inappetence, incompetence, incompetent, noncompetitive, petulance, petulant, petulcity, petulcous, propitiation, propitious, repeat, répétiteur, repetition, repetitive, repetitor
pingō	ping-	pinx-	pict-	paint	depict, depiction, paint, pictorial, picture, pigment, pigmentary, pigmentation, pimiento, pinto, repaint
placeō -pliceō	plac- -plic-	placu-	placit- -plicit-	please	complacency, complacent, complaisance, complaisant, counterplea, displease, displeasure, implead, placebo, placid, placidity, plea, plead, pleasance, pleasant, pleasantry, please, pleasurable, pleasure
plācō	plāc-	plācav-	plācāt-		implacable, placability, placable, placate, placation, placative, placatory
plangō	plang-	planx-	planct-		complain, complainant, complaint, plague, plain, plaint, plaintiff, plaintive, plangency, plangent
plaudō -plodō	plaud- -plod-	plaus-	plaus- -plos-	clap	applaud, applause, displode, displosion, displosive, explode, explosion, explosive, implausibility, implausible, implosion, implosive, nonexplosive, plaudit, plausibility, plausible, plosion, plosive
plectō	plect-	plex-	plex-	plait	amplexus, complect, complex, complexion, complexity, implex, implexion, perplex, perplexity, plexure, plexus
plēō	plē-	plev-	plēt-	fill	accomplish, accomplishment, complement, complementarity, complementary, complementation, complete, completion, completive, compliance, compliant, compliment, Compline, comply, deplete, depletion, depletive, implement, implementation, impletion, incomplete, incompletion, noncompliance, plenary, plenitude, plenitudinous, plenty, plenum, reimplement, reimplementation, replenish, replete, repletion, repletive, resupply, supplement, supplemental, supplementary, supplementation, suppletion, suppletive, suppletory, supply
plicō	plic-	plicav-	plicat-	fold	applicability, applicable, applicant, application, applicative, applicator, applicatory, apply, centuplicate, complicate, complication, contortuplicate, counterploy, demi-plié, deplication, deploy, deployment, duplicate, duplication, duplicator, employ, employee, employment, explicable, explicandum, explicans, explicate, explication, explicative, explicator, explicatory, explicature, exploit, exploitable, exploitation, implicate, implication, implicational, implicature, imply, inapplicable, induplicate, induplication, inexplicable, multiplicand, multiplication, multiplicative, nonexploitation, nonpliant, plait, pleat, pliable, pliancy, pliant, plié, ploy, ply, quadruplicate, reapply, reduplication, replica, replicable, replicant, replicate, replication, replicator, reply, subduplicate, triplicate
plōrō	plor-	plorav-	plorat-	–	deplorable, deplore, implore
poliō	pol-	poliv-	polit-	smoothen	expolish, impolite, interpolate, interpolation, polish, polite, politesse, politure
pōnō (Note: Contracted from port- and sinō)	pōn-	posu-	posit- post-	put	adposition, ambiposition, antepone, anteposition, apposite, apposition, appositional, appositive, apropos, circumposition, component, componential, componentry, composite, composition, compositional, compositionality, compositor, compost, compostable, compote, compound, contraposition, contrapositive, contrapposto, counterproposition, decomposition, decompound, depone, deponent, deposit, deposition, depositional, depositor, depository, dispone, disponee, dispositio, disposition, dispositional, dispositive, dispositor, entrepôt, expone, exponent, exponential, exponentiation, exponible, exposit, exposition, expositional, expositive, expositor, expository, impone, imponent, imposition, impostor, indisposition, interpone, interponent, interposition, juxtaposit, juxtaposition, juxtapositional, oppone, opponent, opposite, opposition, oppositional, oppositive, posit, position, positional, positive, positure, postpone, postposition, postpositional, postpositive, posture, preposition, prepositional, prepositive, prepositor, prepositure, propone, proponent, proposition, propositional, recomposition, reimposition, repone, reposit, reposition, repository, seposit, seposition, superimposition, superposition, supposition, suppositional, suppositive, suppositor, suppository, transposition, transpositional, transpositive
portō	port-	portav-	portat-	carry	apport, asportation, comport, comportable, comportance, comportation, comportment, deport, deportable, deportation, deportee, disport, export, exportable, exportation, import, importable, importance, important, importation, insupportable, nonportable, portability, portable, portage, portamento, portance, portative, porterage, proport, purport, rapport, rapporteur, reexport, reimport, reimportation, report, reportable, reportage, reportative, sport, support, supportable, transport, transportable, transportation
pōtō	pōt-	potav-	potat-	drink	compotation, compotator, perpotation, potability, potable, potation, potion
precor	prec-	precat-	–	pray	apprecation, deprecable, deprecate, deprecation, imprecate, imprecation, pray, prayer, precarious, precation, precatory
prehendō	prehend- prend-	prehend-	prehens- prens-	grasp	apprehend, apprehension, apprehensive, apprentice, apprisal, apprise, comprehend, comprehensible, comprehension, comprehensive, comprisal, comprise, deprehend, emprise, enterprise, entrepreneur, impregnable, impresa, impresario, imprison, imprisonment, inapprehension, incomprehensible, incomprehension, incomprehensive, pregnable, prehend, prehensile, prehensility, prehension, prise, prison, purprise, reprehend, reprehensible, reprieve, reprisal, reprise, surprise
premō -primō	prem- -prim-	press-	press-	press, push	appress, appressorium, compress, compressible, compression, compressional, compressive, compressor, counterpressure, decompress, decompression, depress, depression, depressive, depressor, espresso, express, expressible, expression, expressional, expressive, expressivity, expressor, impress, impressible, impression, impressionable, impressional, impressive, impressor, imprimatur, imprimatura, imprint, incompressibility, incompressible, inexpressible, inexpressive, irrepressible, oppress, oppressible, oppression, oppressive, oppressor, preprint, press, pressure, print, repress, repressible, repression, repressive, repressor, reprimand, reprint, subexpression, suppress, suppressant, suppression, suppressor, surprint, transrepression
†pressō	press-	pressav-	pressat-	press, push	
pugnō	pugn-	pugnav-	pugnat-	fight	impugn, impugnable, impugnation, pugnacious, repugn, repugnance, repugnant
pungō	pung-	pupug-	punct-	prick	appoint, appointee, appointive, appointment, bipunctate, bipunctual, compunction, contrapuntal, counterpoint, demi-pointe, disappoint, disappointment, dispunge, expunction, expunge, impunctate, impunctual, inexpungible, multipoint, poignant, point, pointe, punctate, punctatim, punctation, punctator, punctiform, punctilio, punction, punctual, punctuality, punctuation, puncture, pungency, pungent, puntilla, puntillero, punto, reappoint, reappointment, tripoint
†punctō	punct-	punctav-	punctat-	prick	appoint, appointee, appointive, appointment, bipunctate, bipunctual, compunction, contrapuntal, counterpoint, demi-pointe, disappoint, disappointment, dispunge, expunction, expunge, impunctate, impunctual, inexpungible, multipoint, poignant, point, pointe, punctate, punctatim, punctation, punctator, punctiform, punctilio, punction, punctual, punctuality, punctuation, puncture, pungency, pungent, puntilla, puntillero, punto, reappoint, reappointment, tripoint
pūniō	–	–	–	punish, avenge	impunity, punish, punishable, punitive
putō	put-	putav-	putat-	prune, think	accompt, accomptant, account, accountability, accountable, accountancy, accountant, amputate, amputation, amputee, computable, computation, compute, count, countable, deputable, depute, deputy, discount, disputable, disputant, disputation, disputative, dispute, disreputable, disrepute, imputable, imputation, imputative, impute, incomputable, indisputable, irreputable, nonimputable, precompute, putamen, putaminous, putative, raconteur, recompute, recount, reputable, reputation, repute, supputate, supputation, suppute
putreō	putr-	–	–	be rotten	putredinous, putrefacient, putrefaction, putrefactive, putrefy, putresce, putrescence, putrescent, putrescible, putrescine, putrid, putridity, putrilage, putrilaginous
‡putrescō	putresc-	–	–	be rotten	putredinous, putrefacient, putrefaction, putrefactive, putrefy, putresce, putrescence, putrescent, putrescible, putrescine, putrid, putridity, putrilage, putrilaginous
quaerō -quirō	quaer- -quir-	quaesiv-	quaesit- -quisit-	search, seek	acquire, acquisition, exquire, exquisite, inquest, inquire, inquisitive, perquisite, query, quest
quatiō -cutiō	quat- -cut-	–	quass- -cuss-	shake	cassate, cassation!-- desiderative --, concussion, conquassate, decussation, discuss, discussion, discussive, discutient, percussion, percussive, percussor, quash, quassation, recussion, repercussion, rescue, squash, squassation, succussion, succussive
†quassō	quass-	quassav-	quassat-	shake	cassate, cassation!-- desiderative --, concussion, conquassate, decussation, discuss, discussion, discussive, discutient, percussion, percussive, percussor, quash, quassation, recussion, repercussion, rescue, squash, squassation, succussion, succussive
queror	quer-	quest-	–	complain	quarrel, querent, querimony, querulous
†queritor	querit-	-	–	complain	quarrel, querent, querimony, querulous
rādō	rād-	ras-	ras-	scrape, shave	abrade, abrasion, abrasive, corrade, corrasion, erase, erasure, radula, radular
ranceō	ranc-	–	–	be rotten	rancid, rancor
rapiō -ripiō	rap- -rip-	rapu-	rapt- -rept-		arreption, arreptitious, rapacious, rapacity, rape, rapid, rapidity, rapine, rapt, raptio, raptor, rapture, rapturous, raptus, ravish, subreption, subreptitious, surreptitious
regō -rigō	reg- -rig-	rex-	rect-	keep straight	adret, adroit, alert, arrect, bidirectional, bidirectionality, birectify, biregular, coregency, coregent, correct, correction, correctional, corrective, corrector, correctory, correctress, corregidor, corregimiento, corrigendum, corrigent, corrigibility, corrigible, counterinsurgency, counterinsurgent, derail, derailleur, derailment, derecho, deregulate, deregulation, direct, direction, directional, directionality, directive, director, directorate, directorial, directory, directress, directrix, dirigible, erect, erection, erector, escort, experrection, incorrect, incorrigibility, incorrigible, indirect, indirection, insurgency, insurgent, insurrection, interregent, interregimental, interregional, irregular, irregularity, maladroit, multidirectional, porrect, porrection, rail, rectal, rectification, rectilinear, rectilinearity, rection, rectitude, rectitudinous, rector, rectorate, rectory, rectress, rectricial, rectrix, rectum, redirect, regency, regent, regible, regime, regimen, regiment, regimental, regimentation, region, regional, regle, regula, regular, regularity, regulate, regulation, regulator, regulatory, reregulate, resource, resurge, resurgence, resurgent, resurrect, resurrection, semiregular, source, subrector, subrectory, subregent, subregion, subregional, surge, trirectify, unidirectional, viceregent
rēpō	rēp-	reps-	rēpt-	crawl, creep	obreption, obreptitious, reptation, reptile, reptilian
†reptō	rept-	reptav-	reptat-	crawl, creep	obreption, obreptitious, reptation, reptile, reptilian
rideō	rid-	ris-	ris-	laugh, smile	arride, deride, derision, derisive, irrisible, irrision, ridicule, ridiculous, risibility, risible
rigeō	rig-	–	–	be stiff	de rigueur, nonrigid, rigid, rigidity, rigor, rigorous, semirigid
‡rigescō	rigesc-	rigu-	–	be stiff	de rigueur, nonrigid, rigid, rigidity, rigor, rigorous, semirigid
rodō	rod-	ros-	ros-	gnaw	arrosion, corrode, corrodent, corrodible, corrosion, corrosional, corrosive, corrosivity, erode, erodent, erodibility, erodible, erose, erosion, erosional, erosive, noncorrosive, rectirostral, rodent, rodenticide, rostral, rostrate, rostriform, rostrum
rogō	rog-	rogav-	rogat-	ask	abrogate, abrogation, derogate, derogatory, interrogate, interrogation, interrogative, interrogator, interrogatory, obrogate, obrogation, prorogatio, prorogation, rogatio, rogation, rogatory, subrogate, subrogation, surrogacy, surrogate
rumpō	rump-	rup-	rupt-	break, burst	abrupt, corrupt, corruption, corruptor, disrupt, disruption, disruptive, erumpent, erupt, eruption, eruptive, interrupt, interruption, irrupt, irruption, irruptive, noneruptive, reroute, rout, route, rupture
saliō -siliō	sal- -sil-	salu- -silu-	salt-	jump	assail, assault, desultory, exult, exultant, exultation, insult, insultation, irresilient, resile, resilience, resiliency, resilient, result, resultant, salient, saltant
†saltō	salt- -sult-	saltav-	saltat- -sultat-	jump	assail, assault, desultory, exult, exultant, exultation, insult, insultation, irresilient, resile, resilience, resiliency, resilient, result, resultant, salient, saltant
scandō -scendō	scand- -scend-	scand-	scans- -scens-	climb	ascend, ascension, condescension, descend, descent, scansion, transcend, transcendental
scīō	sci-	sciv-	scit-	know	conscience, nescience, omniscience, plebiscite, prescient, science
scrībō	scrīb-	scrips-	scrīpt-	write	ascribe, circumscribe, conscription, describe, description, descriptive, descriptor, indescribable, inscribe, inscription, nondescript, postscript, prescribe, prescription, prescriptive, proscribe, proscription, proscriptive, scribble, scribe, script, scriptural, scripture, scrivener, subscribe, subscript, subscription, superscript, transcribe, transcript, transcription
secō	sec-	secu-	sect-	cut	bisect, bisection, bisector, bisectrix, dissect, dissection, insect, intersect, intersection, intersectionality, prosect, prosector, resection, secant, sectile, section, sectional, sector, sectorial, segment, subsection, subsector, subsegment, suprasegmental, transect, transection, trisectrix, vivisection
sedeō -sideō	sede- -side-	sed-	sess-	sit	dissident, insidious, nonresident, obsession, obsessive, preside, presidium, reside, resident, sedentary, sediment, sessile, session, subside, supersede, supersession
sedō	sed-	sedav-	sedat-		sedate, sedation, sedative
sentiō	senti-	sens-	sens-	feel	assent, consensual, consensus, consent, dissension, dissent, insensate, nonsense, resent, resentment, scent, sensate, sensation, sensational, sense, sensibility, sensible, sensor, sensual, sentence, sentient, sentiment, sentimental, sentimentality
sequor	sequ-	secut-	–	follow	assecution, consecutive, consequence, consequent, consequential, demisuit, ensuant, ensue, execute, execution, executive, executor, extrinsic, inconsequential, insequent, intrinsic, non sequitur, nonconsecutive, nonsequential, obsequence, obsequent, obsequious, persecute, persecution, persecutor, prosecute, prosecution, prosecutor, prosecutorial, prosecutory, prosecutive, pursual, pursuance, pursuant, pursue, pursuit, pursuivant, resequent, second, secondary, secundine, segue, sequacious, sequacity, sequel, sequela, sequence, sequent, sequential, sequitur, suant, subsecute, subsecutive, subsequent, sue, suit, suitability, suitable, suite, suitor
†sector	sect-	sectat-	–	follow	
serō	ser-	seru-	sert-		assert, assertion, desert, desertion, desertrix, insert, insertion, serial, series
serpō	serp-	serps-	serpt-	crawl	serpent
serviō	serv-	serviv-	servit-	serve	deserve, servant, server, service, servile, servitude, subservience, subservient
servō	serv-	servav-	servat-	save	conservable, conservation, conservative, conservator, conservatory, conserve, observable, observance, observant, observation, observational, observative, observator, observatory, observe, preservable, preservation, preservative, preserve, reservable, reservance, reservation, reservative, reserve
sistō	sist-	stet-	stat-	cause to stand	absist, assist, consist, consistency, consistent, desist, exist, existence, existent, inconsistent, insist, insistence, insistent, irresistible, nonexistent, persist, persistence, persistent, resist, resistible, subsist, subsistence, subsistent
solvō	solv-	solv-	solut-	loosen	absolute, absolution, absolutive, absolutory, absolve, dissolute, dissolution, dissolve, insolubility, insoluble, insolvency, insolvent, irresolute, resolute, resolution, resolve, resolvent, solubility, soluble, solute, solution, solve, solvency, solvend, solvent
sordeō	sord-	sordu-	–	be dirty	sordes, sordid
spargō	sparg- -sperg-	spars-	spars- -spers-	scatter	aspersion, dispersal, disperse, dispersion, sparse
speciō -spiciō	spec- -spic-	spex-	spect-	look	aspect, aspectual, auspices, auspicious, circumspect, circumspection, circumspective, conspecific, conspectus, conspicuous, disrespect, expect, expectancy, expectant, expectation, inauspicious, incircumspect, inconspicuous, inspect, inspection, inspector, interspecific, introspection, introspective, irrespective, nonspecific, perspective, perspicacious, perspicuity, perspicuous, prospect, prospective, prospector, prospectus, respect, respectable, respective, retrospection, retrospective, special, speciality, speciation, brspecie, species, specific, specification, specificity, specimen, speciosity, specious, spectacle, spectacular, spectator, spectral, spectrum, specular, speculate, speculation, speculative, speculator, speculatory, speculum, subspecies
†spectō	spect-	spectav-	spectat-	look	
spirō	spir-	spirav-	spirat-	breathe	aspiration, aspire, conspiracy, conspirator, conspiratorial, conspire, inspiration, inspirational, inspire, perspiration, perspire, preaspiration, respiration, respirator, respiratory, spiracle
splendeō	splend-	splendu-	–		resplendent, splendent, splendid, splendiferous, splendor
spondeō	spond-	spopond-	spons-	promise	correspond, correspondence, correspondent, despond, despondency, despondent, espousage, espousal, espouse, irresponsible, nonresponsive, respond, respondence, respondent, response, responsibility, responsible, responsive, sponsal, sponsion, sponsional, sponsor, spousal, spouse
†sponsō	spons-	sponsav-	sponsat-	promise	correspond, correspondence, correspondent, despond, despondency, despondent, espousage, espousal, espouse, irresponsible, nonresponsive, respond, respondence, respondent, response, responsibility, responsible, responsive, sponsal, sponsion, sponsional, sponsor, spousal, spouse
squaleō	squal-	squalu-	–		squalid, squalor
statuō -stituō	statu- -stitu-	statu- -stitu-	statut- -stitut-	cause to stand	constituency, constituent, constitute, constitution, constitutional, destitute, destitution, institute, institution, institutional, prostitute, prostitution, reconstitute, restitution, statuary, statue, statuette, statute, statutory, substituent, substitute, substitution
staurō	staur-	staurav-	staurat-		instaurate, instauration, instaure, restaurant, restoration, restorative
sternō	stern-	strav-	strat-	spread, strew	prostrate, prostration, stratus, stratum, substratum
stō	st-	stet-	stat-	stand	antestature, circumstance, circumstant, circumstantial, circumstantiality, constable, constancy, constant, consubstantial, consubstantiality, consubstantiation, contrast, contrastable, disestablish, distance, distant, establish, establishment, estate, extant, inconstancy, inconstant, instability, instance, instancy, instant, instate, instatement, insubstantial, presto, reinstate, reinstatement, restate, restatement, stabile, stability, stable, stage, stamen, stamina, staminal, stance, stanchion, stanza, statant, statary, state, statement, station, stationary, stative, stator, stature, status, stet, substance, substantial, substantiality, substantiate, substantiation, substantive, substation, transubstantiate, transubstantiation
stringō	string-	strinx-	strict-	squeeze	astrict, astriction, astrictive, astringe, astringency, astringent, constrain, constraint, constrict, constriction, constrictive, constrictor, constringe, constringency, constringent, distrain, distraint, distress, district, restrain, restraint, restrict, restriction, restrictive, restrictor, restringe, restringency, restringent, strain, strict, stricture, stringency, stringent
struō	stru-	strux-	struct-		construct, constructible, construction, constructive, constructor, construe, destroy, destruction, destructive, destructor, indestructible, infrastructure, instruct, instruction, instructive, instructor, instrument, instrumental, obstruct, obstruent, obstruction, structural, structure, superstructure
studeō	stud-	studu-	–		étude, student, studio, studious, study
stupeō	stup-	stupu-	–	be stunned	stupefaction, stupendous, stupid, stupidity, stupor, stuporous
suadeō	suad-	suas-	suas-		dissuade, dissuasion, persuade, persuasion, persuasive
sum	es-	fu-	futur-	be	absence, absent, absentaneous, absentee, adessive, antessive, apudessive, coessential, disinterest, ens, entitative, entity, essence, essential, essive, exessive, future, futurity, improve, improvement, inessential, inessive, interest, nonentity, nonessential, nonpresence, nonrepresentational, omnipresence, omnipresent, presence, present, presentable, presentaneous, presentation, presentational, presentative, presentator, presentee, presentment, proud, prowess, represent, representable, representamen, representant, representation, representational, representative, subessive, superessive
sūmō (Note: Contracted from sub and emō)	sūm-	sūmps-	sūmpt-	take	absume, absumption, assumable, assume, assumpsit, assumption, assumptive, consumable, consume, consumption, consumptive, inconsumable, inconsumptible, insume, nonconsumptive, nonresumption, presume, presumption, presumptive, presumptuous, reassume, resume, résumé, resumption, resumptive, subsume, subsumption, subsumptive, sumption, sumptuary, sumptuosity, sumptuous, transume, transumption, transumptive
suō	su-	su-	sūt-	sew	assument, sutile, suture
taceō	tac- -tic-	tacu-	tacit-	keep silent	reticence, reticent, tacit, taciturn, taciturnity
tangō -tingō	tang- -ting-	tetig- -tig-	tact-	touch	attain, attainment, contact, contingency, contingent, intact, intangible, integral, pertingent, tactile, tangent, tangental, tangential, tangible
tegō	teg-	tex-	tect-	cover	contection, detect, detection, detective, detector, integument, obtect, protect, protection, protective, protector, protectorate, protégé, tectrix, tectum, tegmen, tegmental, tegula, tegular, tegument, tile, toga
tendō	tend-	tetend-	tens- tent-	stretch	ambitendency, attempt, attend, attendee, attent, attention, attentive, coextend, coextension, coextensive, contend, contention, contentious, counterextension, detent, détente, distend, distension, distent, distention, entendre, entente, etendue, extend, extensible, extension, extensional, extensionality, extensive, extensivity, extensor, extent, inattention, inattentive, inextensible, intend, intense, intensification, intension, intensional, intensity, intensive, intent, intention, intentional, intentionality, obtend, obtension, ostensible, ostension, ostensive, ostensory, ostent, ostentation, ostentatious, portend, portension, portent, portentous, pretend, pretense, pretension, reintensify, subtend, subtense, superintend, superintendency, superintendent, tempt, temptation, tend, tendency, tendential, tendentious, tender, tense, tensible, tensile, tensility, tension, tensure, tent, tentacle, tentacular, tentage, tentation, tentative, tentiginous, tentorium
†temptō	tempt-	temptāv-	temptāt-	stretch	
†tentō	tent-	tentāv-	tentāt-	stretch	
teneō -tineō	ten- -tin-	tenu- -tinu-	tent-	hold, keep	abstain, abstention, abstinence, abstinent, appertain, appertinent, appurtenance, appurtenant, contain, content, continence, continent, continental, contratenor, countenance, detain, detention, discontent, entertain, entertainment, impertinent, incontinence, incontinent, intenible, maintain, maintenance, malcontent, obtain, pertain, pertinacious, pertinacity, pertinence, pertinent, retain, retainer, retention, retentive, retinue, sostenuto, sustain, sustenance, tenacious, tenacity, tenet, tenor, tenure, tenurial, tenuto, transcontinental
†tentō	tent-	tentāv-	tentāt-	hold, keep	
tepeō	tep-	–	–	be lukewarm	subtepid, tepefaction, tepid, tepidarium, tepidity, tepor
‡tepescō	tepesc-	tepu-	–	be lukewarm	subtepid, tepefaction, tepid, tepidarium, tepidity, tepor
tergeō	terg-	ters-	ters-	wipe	absterge, abstergent, abstersion, abstersive, deterge, detergency, detergent, terse
terō	ter-	triv-	trīt-	rub, wear	attrition, contrite, contrition, detriment, detrimental, detrital, detrition, detritivore, detritivorous, detritus, retriment, tribulation, trite, triturate, trituration, triture
terreō	terr-	terru-	territ-	frighten	counterterror, deter, determent, deterrence, deterrent, terrible, terrific, terrify, terror
†territō	territ-	-	territāt-	frighten	counterterror, deter, determent, deterrence, deterrent, terrible, terrific, terrify, terror
texō	tex-	texu-	text-	weave	context, contextual, contextuality, countertext, intertextual, intertextuality, intertexture, noncontextual, nontextual, praetexta, pretext, pretextual, pretextuality, subcontext, subtext, subtextual, subtextuality, subtile, subtle, subtlety, tessitura, text, textile, textual, textuality, textuary, textural, texture, tissue
timeō	tim-	timu-	–	be afraid	timidity, timorous
tinniō	tinn-	tinniv-	tinnit-	ring	tinnitus
torqueō	torqu-	tors-	tort-	twist	contort, contortion, detortion, distort, distortion, extort, extortion, retort, torque, torsade, torse, tort, tortillon, tortrix, torture
torreō	torr-	torru-	tost-		torrent, torrential, torrid
trahō	trah-	trax-	tract-	drag, draw	abstract, abstraction, abstractive, attract, attractant, attraction, attractive, attractor, contract, contraction, contractional, contractive, contractor, contrahent, detract, detraction, detractive, detractor, distract, distraction, distractive, distrait, extract, extraction, extractive, extractor, intractable, portrait, portraiture, portray, portrayal, protractor, retract, retraction, retractor, subtract, subtraction, subtractive, subtractor, subtrahend, tract, tractable, tractate, tractation, tractator, tractile, traction, tractional, tractor, trait
†tractō	tract- -trect-	tractav-	tractat- -trectat-	drag, draw	
trudō	trud-	trus-	trus-	thrust	abstrude, abstruse, abstrusion, detrude, detrusion, extrude, extrusible, extrusion, extrusive, intrude, intrusion, intrusive, obtrude, obtrusion, obtrusive, protrude, protrudent, protrusion, protrusive, retrude, retruse, retrusion
tueor	tu-	tut-, tuit-	–		intuition, intuitive, tuition, tutelage, tutor
tumeō	tum-	tumu-	–	be swollen	detumescence, tumescent, tumid, tumidity, tumor
turgeō	turg-	–	–		turgid, turgidity, turgor
umeō	um-	–	–	be moist	humid, humidify, humidity, humidor
urō	ur-	uss-	ust-	burn	adustion, urn
utor	ut-	us-	–	use	abuse, abusive, disabuse, disuse, perusal, peruse, use, usufruct, usure, usurp, usury, utility
vacō	vac-	vacav-	vacat-	be empty	vacancy, vacant, vacate, vacation
vadō	vad-	vas-	vas-	go	evade, evasion, evasive, invade, invasion, invasive, pervasive
valeō	val-	valu-	valit-	be strong	ambivalence, ambivalent, avail, availability, available, bivalent, convalesce, convalescence, convalescent, countervail, covalent, devaluate, devaluation, devalue, equivalence, equivalent, evaluate, evaluation, evaluative, evaluator, invalid, invalidate, invaluable, multivalent, nonequivalence, prevail, prevalence, prevalent, quadrivalent, quantivalence, reevaluate, reevaluation, revaluation, revalue, transvaluation, transvalue, trivalent, univalent, valediction, valedictorian, valedictory, valence, valerian, valetudinarian, valetudinary, valiancy, valiant, valid, validate, validation, validational, validator, validity, valine, valor, valorous, valuable, valuation, value, valuta
‡valescō	valesc-	–	–	be strong	
vehō	veh-	vex-	vect-	carry	advect, advection, advective, biconvex, bivector, circumvection, convect, convection, convective, convector, convex, convexity, equiconvex, extravehicular, invect, invection, invective, inveigh, nonconvective, pretervection, provection, quasiconvex, quasiconvexity, transvection, vection, vector, vectorial, vecture, vehicle, vehicular, vex, vexation, vexatious
†vexō	vex-	vexāv-	vexāt-	carry	advect, advection, advective, biconvex, bivector, circumvection, convect, convection, convective, convector, convex, convexity, equiconvex, extravehicular, invect, invection, invective, inveigh, nonconvective, pretervection, provection, quasiconvex, quasiconvexity, transvection, vection, vector, vectorial, vecture, vehicle, vehicular, vex, vexation, vexatious
vellō	vell-	vuls-	vuls-		avulsion, convulse, convulsion, convulsive, revulsion
veniō	ven-	ven-	vent-	come	advene, advenient, advent, adventist, adventitious, adventure, adventurous, avenue, circumvent, circumvention, circumventive, circumventor, contravene, contravention, convenance, convene, convenience, convenient, convent, conventicle, convention, conventional, coven, covenant, event, eventual, eventuality, inconvenience, inconvenient, intervene, intervention, introvenient, invent, inventio, invention, inventive, inventory, nonconventional, nonevent, nonintervention, obvention, parvenu, prevene, prevent, prevention, preventive, provenance, provenience, provenient, reconvene, reinvent, reinvention, revenant, revenue, souvenance, souvenir, subvene, subvention, supervene, supervenience, supervenient, supervention, venitive, venture, venturous, venue
†ventō	vent-	ventāv-	-	come	
†ventitō	ventit-	ventitāv-	-	come	
vereor	ver-	verit-	–		irreverent, revere, reverence, reverend, reverent, reverential
vergō	verg-	–	–		converge, convergence, convergent, diverge, divergence, divergent, vergence
vertō	vert-	vert-	vers-	turn	adversarial, adversary, adversative, adverse, adversion, adversity, advert, advertent, animadversion, animadvert, anteversion, antevert, aversation, averse, aversion, avert, avertible, contraversion, controversial, controversy, controvert, conversant, conversation, conversational, converse, conversion, convert, convertibility, convertible, diverse, diversion, diversionary, diversity, divert, divertible, divorce, everse, eversible, eversion, eversive, evert, extrorse, extroversion, extrovert, inadvertent, incontrovertible, indivertible, interconversion, interconvert, interconvertible, intervert, introrse, introversion, introversive, introvert, inverse, inversion, invert, invertible, irreversible, multiverse, nonconvertible, nonuniversal, obversant, obverse, obversion, obvert, perverse, perversion, perversity, pervert, pervertibility, pervertible, reconversion, reconvert, reconvertible, reversal, reverse, reversible, reversion, reversionary, reversive, revert, revertent, revertibility, revertible, revertive, subversion, subversionary, subversive, subvert, subvertible, transverse, traversal, traverse, universal, universality, universe, university, varsity, versable, versant, versatile, versatility, verse, versicle, versicular, versification, versificator, version, verso, versus, versute, vertebra, vertebral, vertebrate, vertex, vertical, vertiginous, vertigo
†versō	vers-	versav-	versat-	turn	
videō	vid-	vid-	vis-	see	advice, advisable, advise, advisement, advisor, advisory, envisage, envisagement, envision, evidence, evident, evidential, evidentiality, evidentiary, improvidence, improvident, improvisation, improvisational, improvisator, improvisatory, improvise, imprudence, imprudent, inevident, interview, invisible, nonvisual, preview, provide, providence, provident, provision, provisional, provisionality, proviso, provisory, prudence, prudent, prudential, purvey, purveyance, purveyor, purview, review, supervision, supervisor, supervisory, survey, surveyor, video, view, vis-à-vis, visa, visage, visibility, visible, vision, visionary, visitation, visor, vista, visual, voila, voyeur
†visitō	visit-	visitav-	visitat-	see	
vidō	vid-	vis-	vis-		divide, dividend, divisibility, divisible, division, divisional, divisive, divisor, individual, individuality, indivisible
vincō	vinc-	vic-	vict-	conquer, win	convict, conviction, convince, convincible, evict, eviction, evince, evincible, inconvincible, invincible, pervicacious, revict, revince, vanquish, vanquishment, victor, Victoria, Victorian, victorious, victory, victress, victrice, victrix, Vincent
vitō	vit-	vitāv-	vitāt-	shun	evitable, evitation, evite, inevitability, inevitable
vīvō	vīv-	vix-	vict-	live	convivial, conviviality, ex vivo, in vivo, revivable, revival, revive, reviviscence, revivor, survivable, survival, survive, survivor, viand, victual, victualage, viva, vivace, vivacious, vivacity, vivandière, vivant, vivarium, vivid, vivific, vivification, vivisepulture, vivo
†victitō	victit-	-	-	live	convivial, conviviality, ex vivo, in vivo, revivable, revival, revive, reviviscence, revivor, survivable, survival, survive, survivor, viand, victual, victualage, viva, vivace, vivacious, vivacity, vivandière, vivant, vivarium, vivid, vivific, vivification, vivisepulture, vivo
‡vīviscō	vīvisc-	-	–	live	convivial, conviviality, ex vivo, in vivo, revivable, revival, revive, reviviscence, revivor, survivable, survival, survive, survivor, viand, victual, victualage, viva, vivace, vivacious, vivacity, vivandière, vivant, vivarium, vivid, vivific, vivification, vivisepulture, vivo
vocō	voc-	vocāv-	vocāt-	call	advocacy, advocate, advocation, advocator, advocatory, advoke, advowson, avocation, avouch, avow, avowal, convocation, disavow, disavowal, equivocate, equivocation, evocative, evoke, invocation, invoke, prevocational, provocation, provocative, provocator, provoke, revocable, revocation, revoke, vocation, vocational, vouch, vouchee, voucher, vouchsafe
volō	vol-	volav-	volat-	fly	avolation, circumvolant, circumvolation, nonvolatile, volatile, volatility, volitant, volitation
†volitō	volit-	volitav-	volitat-	fly	avolation, circumvolant, circumvolation, nonvolatile, volatile, volatility, volitant, volitation
volō	vell-	volu-	–	wish	benevolence, benevolent, involuntary, malevolence, malevolent, velleity, volitient, volition, volitional, volitive, voluntary, volunteer
volvō	volv-	volv-	volūt-	roll	advolution, archivolt, circumvolute, circumvolution, circumvolve, coevolution, coevolutionary, coevolve, convolute, convolution, convolutionary, convolve, devolute, devolution, devolutionary, devolve, devolvement, evolute, evolution, evolutionary, evolve, evolvent, involucrate, involucre, involucrum, involute, involution, involve, involvement, multivolume, nonevolutionary, revolt, revoluble, revolute, revolution, revolutionary, revolve, vault, volte, volte-face, voltigeur, volubility, voluble, volume, voluminous, volva, volvelle, volvent, Volvox, voussoir
†volūtō	volūt-	volūtav-	volūtat-	roll	
vomō	vom-	vomu-	vomit-	–	vomit, vomition, vomitory, vomitus
†vomitō	vomit-	-	-	–	vomit, vomition, vomitory, vomitus
vorō	vor-	vorāv-	vorāt-	swallow	carnivore, devoration, devoré, devour, omnivore, omnivorous, voracious, voracity, voraginous
voveō	vov-	vov-	vot-	vow	devote, devotee, devotion, devotional, devout, devove, devow, votary, vote, votive, vow
Citation form	Present stem	Perfect stem	Participial stem	Meaning	English derivatives

Key
†	Frequentative
‡	Inchoative
