= Valu Home Centers =

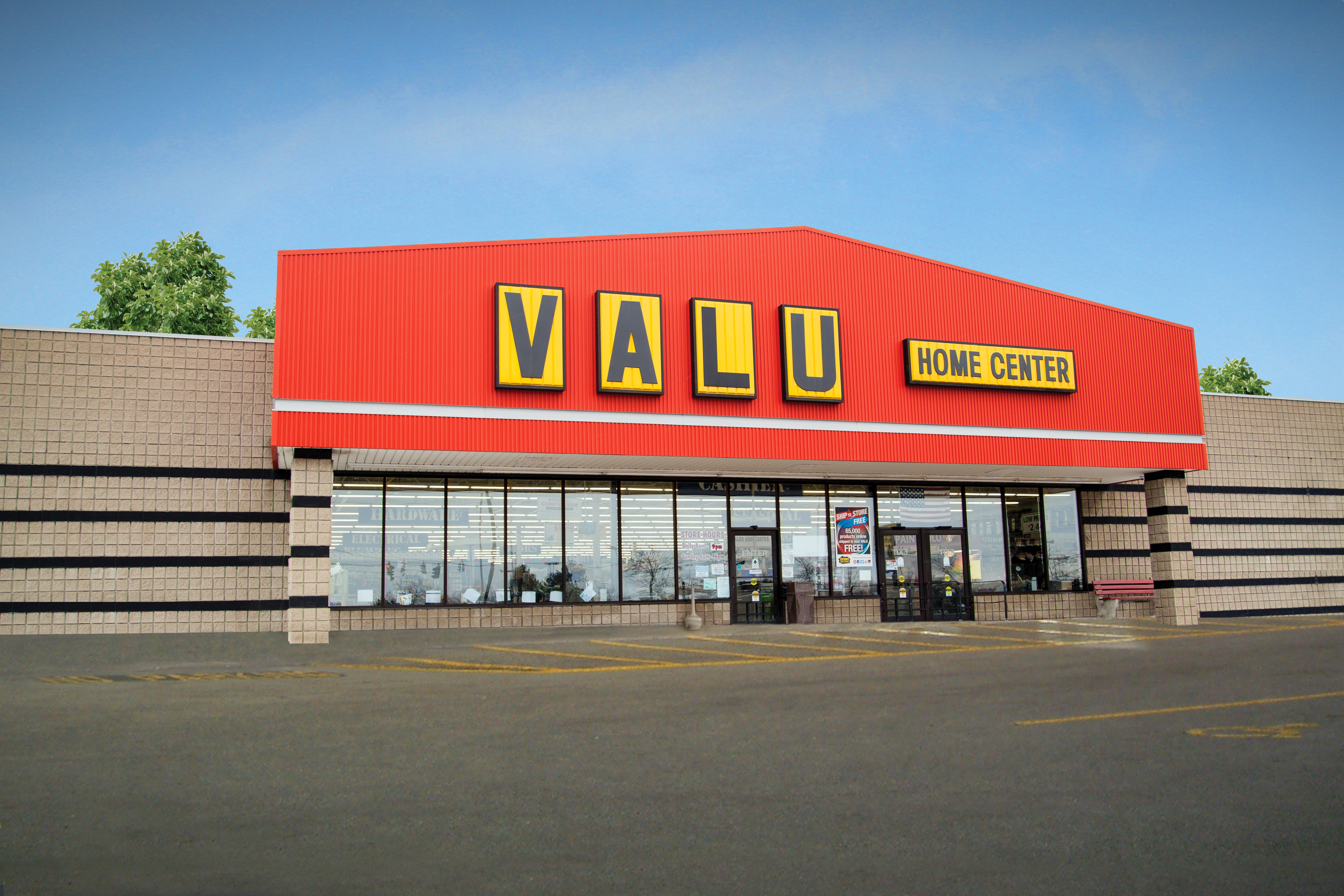

Valu Home Centers is a privately owned regional home improvement and household hardware chain based in Buffalo, New York; established in 1968.

== Overview ==
The chain has 28 stores located in New York and Northwestern Pennsylvania.

Their first store was located on Clinton Street and South Rossler Avenue in Cheektowaga, which is where they are currently headquartered.

They sell such things as plumbing, flooring, electrical and lawn and garden goods.

== Philanthropy ==
Since 2000, Valu Home Centers has raised over $373,000 for their "Make A Change" program benefitting Kids Escaping Drugs.

The company also raised $3,716,795 for Habitat for Humanity.

== Revenue ==
According to Indeed.com, they employ nearly 900 associates and have revenue over $100 million.

== See also ==
- Ernst Home Centers
