= Present value of benefits =

Present value of benefits (PVB) is a term used in cost-benefit analysis and project appraisal that refers to the discounted sum, or present value, of a stream of benefits associated with a project or proposal.
