= MIT Global Startup Workshop =

- Founded: 1998
- Type: Not-for-profit Educational Organization
- Location: Cambridge, Massachusetts, United States
- Region served: Worldwide
- Parent organization: Massachusetts Institute of Technology
- Website: gsw.mit.edu

MIT Global Startup Workshop (MIT GSW) is an event organized by the Massachusetts Institute of Technology run by a student group in association with Martin Trust Center for MIT Entrepreneurship, the MIT Legatum Center for Development and Entrepreneurship, and the MIT Regional Entrepreneurship Acceleration Program (MIT REAP).

MIT GSW is an annual conference.

Since 1998, the organization has held 21 international workshops across 6 continents.

== History ==
The MIT Global Startup Workshop (MIT GSW) was founded in 1997 when the MIT $50K (now the MIT $100K) Entrepreneurship Competition received numerous queries from around the world from organizations interested in starting and improving their own business plan competitions (BPCs). The first MIT GSW was held in Cambridge, Massachusetts in March 1998. A decade later, in 2007 the MIT GSW expanded its mission to include all aspects of the entrepreneurial ecosystem. Since its founding, the MIT GSW has held 21 international workshops across 6 continents, reached participants from over 70 nations, and grown to become the premier workshop for fostering global entrepreneurship.

- 1999: Singapore
- 2000: Seville, Spain
- 2001: Melbourne, Australia
- 2002: Bologna, Italy
- 2003: Beijing, China
- 2004: Cambridge, United Kingdom
- 2005: Abu Dhabi, United Arab Emirates
- 2006: Buenos Aires, Argentina
- 2007: Trondheim, Norway
- 2008: Madrid, Spain
- 2009: Cape Town, South Africa
- 2010: Reykjavík, Iceland
- 2011: Seoul, South Korea
- 2012: Istanbul, Turkey
- 2013: Tallinn, Estonia
- 2014: Marrakesh, Morocco
- 2015: Guatemala City, Guatemala
- 2016: Hyderabad, India
- 2017: Santiago, Chile
- 2018: Bangkok, Thailand
- 2019: Bogotá, Colombia
- 2020: Grenoble, France (cancelled due to Covid)
- 2023: Athens, Greece
- 2025: Warsaw, Poland
- 2026: Daegu, Korea

== Featured past speakers ==
- Olafur Ragnar Grimsson, President of Iceland
- Robert Langer, Co-founder of Moderna and most cited engineer in history
- Iván Duque, President of Colombia
- Toomas Hendrik Ilves, President of The Republic Of Estonia
- Hwang Chang-Gyu, National CTO of South Korea
- Dean Kamen, Inventor of Segway
- Robin Chase, Founder of Zipcar
- Lars Rasmussen, Co-founder of Google Maps
- Richard K. Lester, MIT nuclear engineer, educator, and author
- Krisztina 'Z' Holly, Founder of The First Tedx
- Bill Aulet, Managing Director of the MIT Martin Trust Center
- Desh Desphande, Founder of MIT Deshpande Center for Innovation
- Ariya Banomyong, Managing Director of LINE Thailand
- Pita Limjaroenrat, Executive Director, Grab Thailand
- Fiona Murray, Chair of the NATO Innovation Fund
- Conrad Wolfram, Founder of Wolfram Research

== Structure of the conference ==
MIT GSW platform facilitates conversations via panels and keynotes at the interface of

- Entrepreneurship
- Government Policy
- Social and Development issues
- Corporate responsibility
- Startup culture and ecosystem

MIT GSW is also a platform for extensive coaching for participants through a Business Plan Competition, Elevator Pitch Competition, and active mentoring for startups.

== MIT GSW Competitions ==
MIT GSW offers multiple competitions of different scales and topical interests each year. Historically, GSW has included competitions, like the Elevator Pitch Competition, a Business Plan Competition, and a Startup Showcase, to shed light on innovative ventures and projects in the region of interest. Mentorship, scale, themes, and prizes vary in each edition of the conference.

== See also ==
- Massachusetts Institute of Technology
- Martin Trust Center for MIT Entrepreneurship
