= MIT Sloan School of Management =

Business school of the Massachusetts Institute of Technology

Coordinates: 42°21′39″N 71°05′02″W

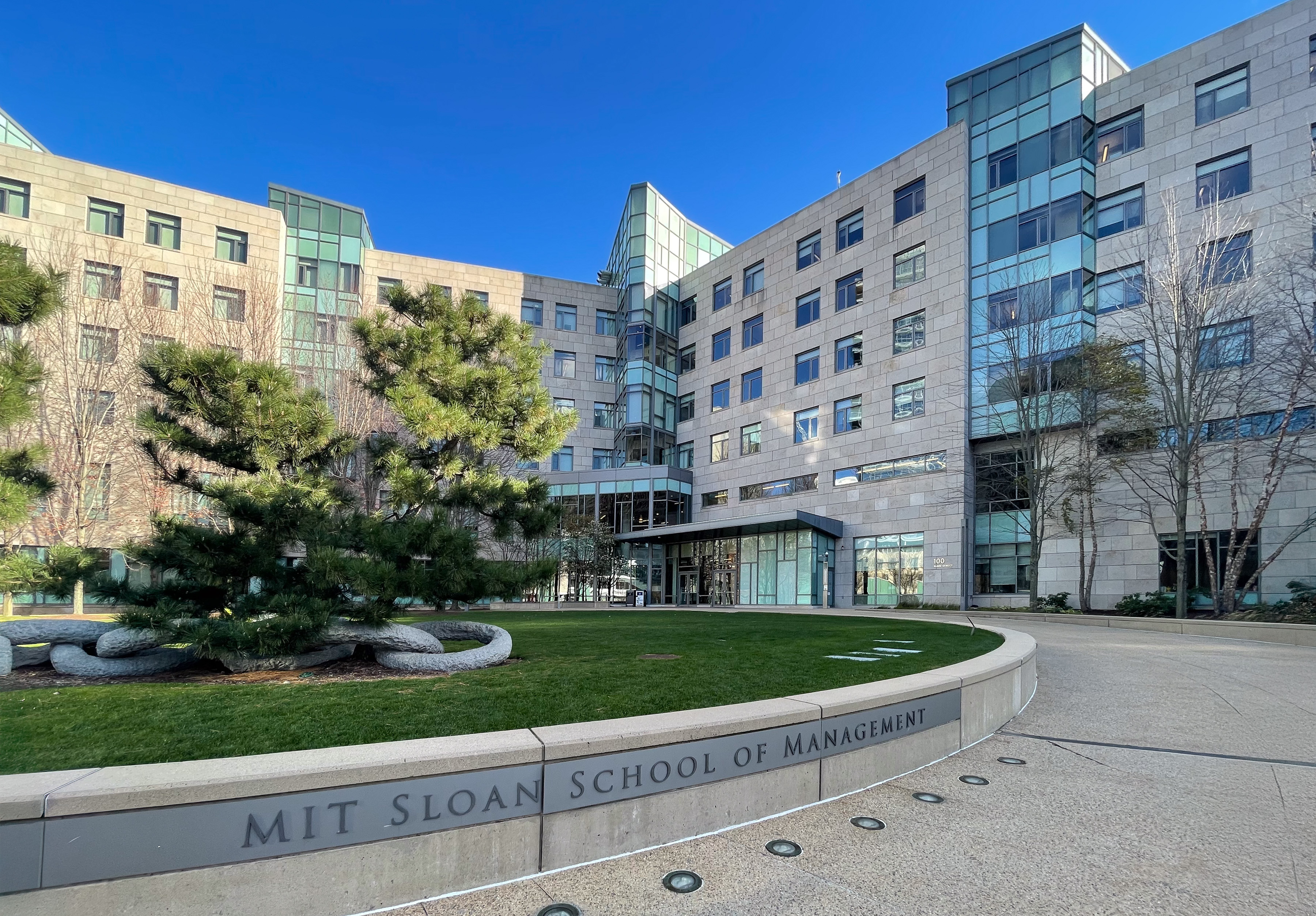
- Type: Private business school
- Established: 1914
- Parent institution: Massachusetts Institute of Technology
- Accreditation: AACSB International
- Endowment: $1.6 billion
- Dean: Richard M. Locke
- Faculty: 116
- Students: 1,300
- Location: Cambridge, Massachusetts, United States
- Website: mitsloan.mit.edu

The MIT Sloan School of Management (branded as MIT Sloan) is the business school of the Massachusetts Institute of Technology, a private university in Cambridge, Massachusetts.

MIT Sloan offers bachelor's, master's, and doctoral degree programs, as well as executive education. Many influential ideas in management and finance originated at the school, including the Black–Scholes model, the random walk hypothesis, the binomial options pricing model, and the field of system dynamics. The faculty has included numerous Nobel laureates in economics and John Bates Clark Medal winners.

== History ==
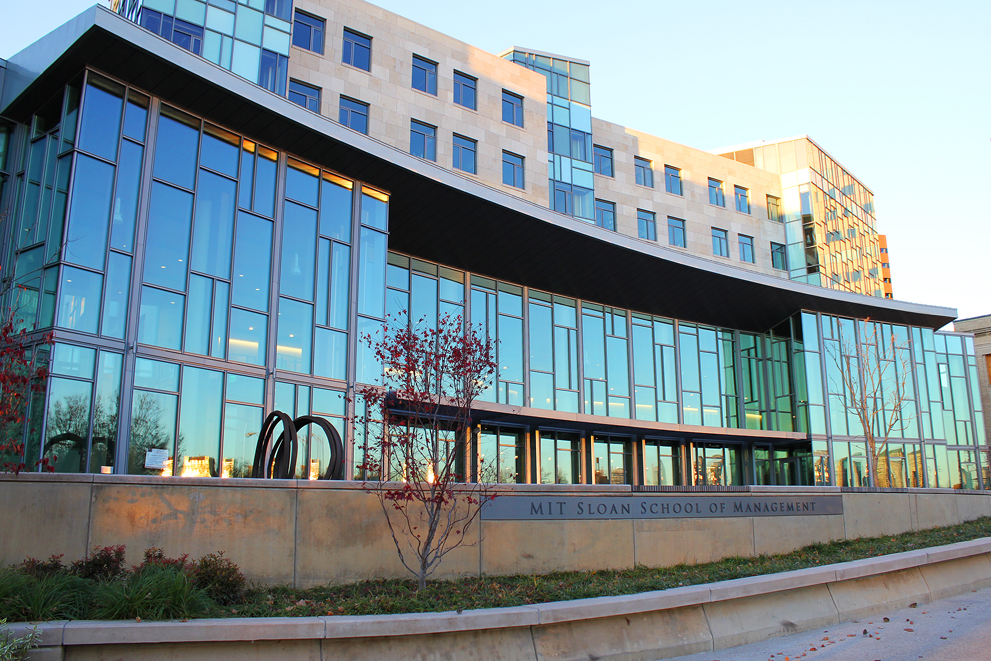
MIT Sloan completed its new central building, known as E62, in 2010.

The MIT Sloan School of Management began in 1914 as the engineering administration curriculum ("Course 15") in the MIT Department of Economics and Statistics. The scope and depth of this educational focus grew steadily in response to advances in the theory and practice of management.

A program offering a master's degree in management was established in 1925. The world's first university-based mid-career education program—the Sloan Fellows program—was created in 1931 under the sponsorship of Alfred P. Sloan, himself an 1895 MIT graduate, who was the chief executive officer of General Motors and has since been credited with creating the modern corporation. An Alfred P. Sloan Foundation grant established the MIT School of Industrial Management in 1952 with the charge of educating the "ideal manager". In 1964, the school was renamed in Sloan's honor as the Alfred P. Sloan School of Management. In the following decades, the school grew to the point that in 2000, management became the second-largest undergraduate major at MIT. In 2005, an undergraduate minor in management was opened to 100 students each year. In 2014, the school celebrated 100 years of management education at MIT.

Since its founding, the school has initiated many international efforts to improve regional economies and positively shape the future of global business. In the 1960s, the school played a leading role in founding the first Indian Institute of Management. Other initiatives include the MIT-China Management Education Project, the International Faculty Fellows Program, and partnerships with IESE Business School in Spain, Sungkyunkwan University in South Korea, Universidade Nova de Lisboa in Portugal, the Skolkovo Moscow School of Management in Russia, and Tsinghua University in China. In 2014, the school launched the MIT Regional Entrepreneurship Acceleration Program (REAP), which brings leaders from developing regions to MIT for two years to improve their economies. In 2015, MIT worked in collaboration with the Central Bank of Malaysia to establish Asia School of Business in Kuala Lumpur, Malaysia.

== Academics ==
Business school rankings

United States
- QS MBA: 1
- Financial Times MBA: 1
- Bloomberg MBA: 9
- USNWR MBA: 6
- USNWR Undergraduate: 2
- THE Business: 1

Global
- QS MBA: 1
- Financial Times MBA: 1
- THE Business: 1

The curriculum is focused on action learning, which requires that students apply concepts learned in the classroom to real-world business settings. Courses are taught using the case method, lectures, team projects, and hands-on Action Learning Labs. The academic level of coursework is considered extremely demanding by business school standards, with a greater emphasis on analytical reasoning and quantitative analysis than most programs.

Academic rigor has a strong influence on the school's culture. The first semester, also known as the core, is often considered the most difficult semester by design. Courses are graded using letter grades and on the standard five-point MIT scale. In its graduate programs, anything less than a 4.0 ('B') average will result in the student not being allowed to graduate. Unlike most business schools, MIT Sloan does not offer any academic honors at graduation, consistent with the practice throughout all of MIT. The philosophy behind this is that the 'honor' is in being an MIT graduate.

MIT Sloan closely collaborates with other parts of MIT, in particular the School of Engineering, the School of Science, and the Department of Economics. A special joint degree program with the School of Engineering is the Leaders for Global Operations (LGO) program, where students concurrently complete an MBA and a Master of Science in engineering. Another joint degree program aimed at students with more industry experience (an average of 8 to 10 years) is the System Design and Management (SDM) program, where students complete a Master of Science in Engineering and Management.

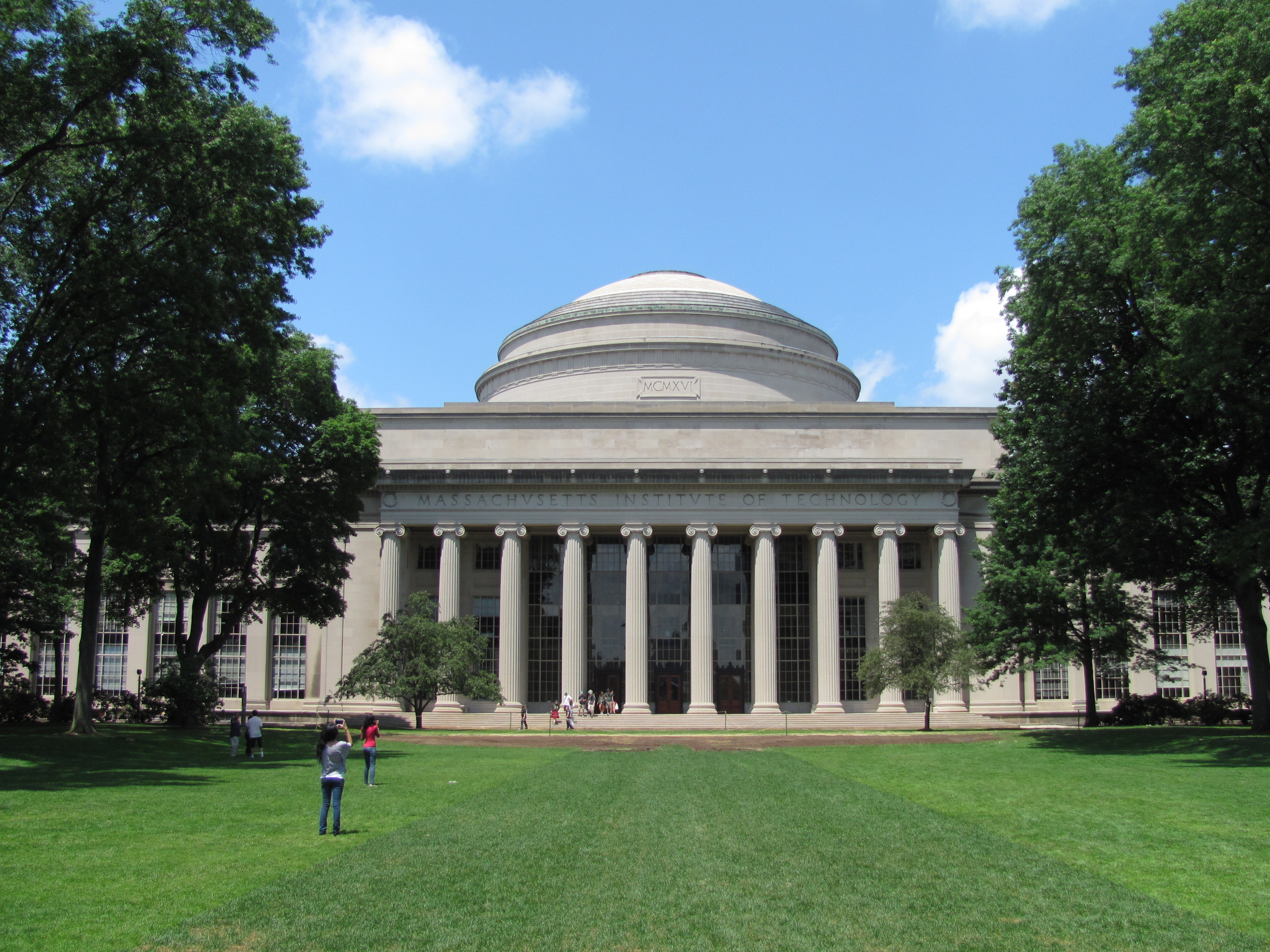
MIT Sloan degrees are conferred at Killian Court in the Institute-wide commencement.

Creativity and invention are constant themes at the school. The MBA track in Entrepreneurship & Innovation features action learning labs which pair students with companies to learn how to solve complex problems relating to emerging technologies. These action learning labs include Entrepreneurship Lab, Innovation Teams, and Leading Sustainable Systems Lab. Global Entrepreneurship Lab and Global Health Delivery Lab send MBA students to work onsite with startups in different parts of the world. The Martin Trust Center for MIT Entrepreneurship, one of the few business school entrepreneurship centers in the world focused on high tech, offers many other entrepreneurial activities and mentorship throughout the year. The annual MIT $100K Entrepreneurship Competition is one of the largest business plan competitions in the world, helping to launch more than 130 companies with a market capitalization of over $15 billion.

In 2016, the school's MBA program was ranked #2 worldwide for social and environmental impact by Corporate Knights magazine.

== Global offices ==
MIT Sloan operates two global offices, the MIT Sloan Latin America Office (MSLAO) in Santiago, Chile, and the MIT Sloan Office for Southeast Asian Nations (MSAO) in Bangkok, Thailand. MSLAO opened in 2013, and MSAO is expected to open in October 2024.

== Student life ==
MIT Sloan MBA undergraduate majors
Engineering	32%
Business	21%
Economics	16%
Science & Math	11%
Humanities	11%
Social Science	9%

MIT Sloan students and alumni informally call themselves Sloanies. The MIT Sloan culture is similar to, but also distinct from, overall MIT culture, and is influenced most strongly by its MBA program. MBA students come from more than 60 countries every year, with just over half coming from North America, and 60% holding US citizenship. Prior to business school, engineering is the most popular undergraduate major among students. 46% of the class is female.

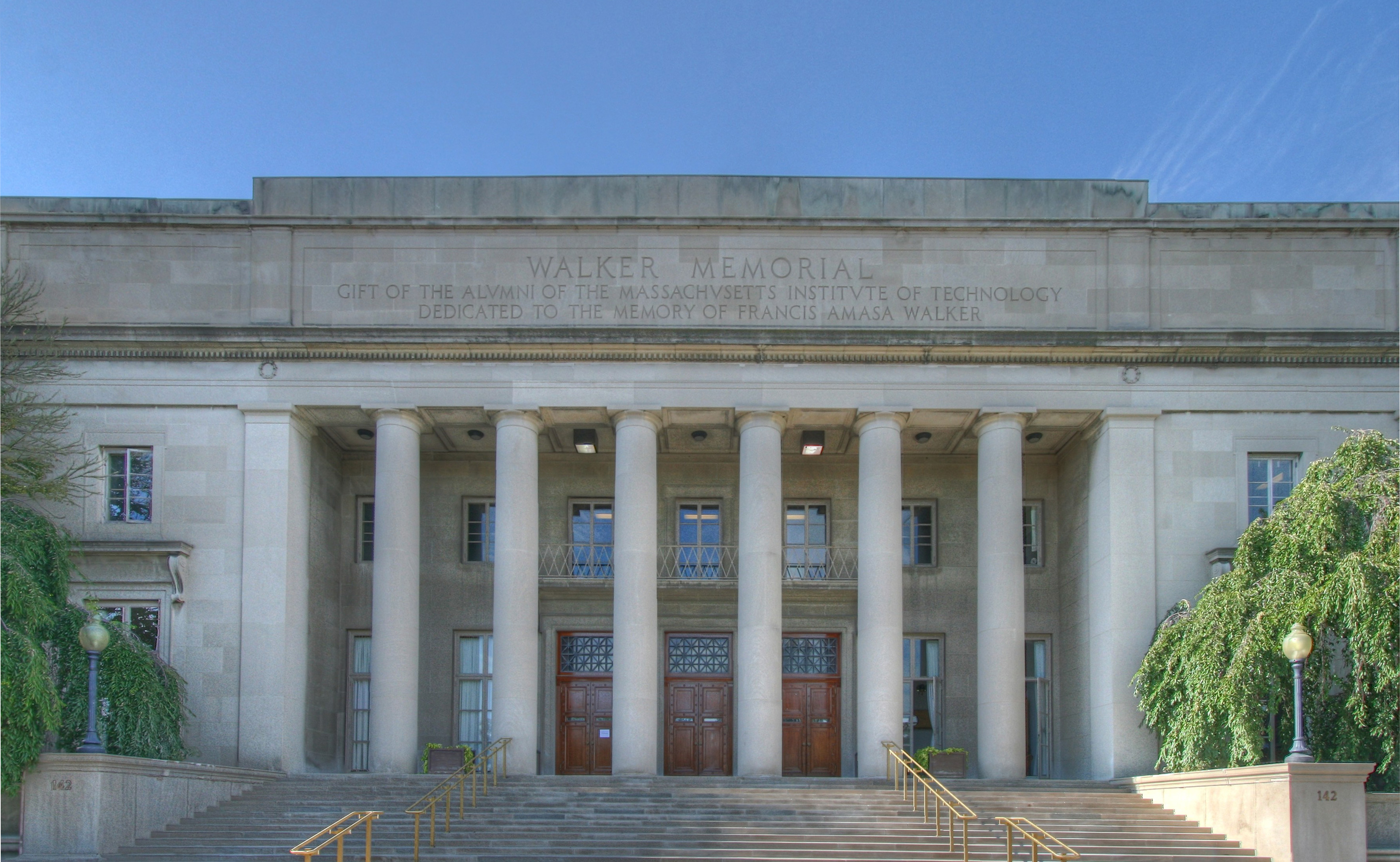
Walker Memorial is the primary venue for C-Functions and other events.

A staple of MIT Sloan MBA life is the weekly C-Function, which stands for "cultural function" or "consumption function". The school sponsors food and drink for all members of the MIT Sloan graduate community to enjoy entertainment organized by specific campus cultural groups or clubs as well as parties with non-cultural themes. C-Functions are usually held most Thursdays in the Walker Memorial building, which is also used as the venue for many other MIT Sloan community events. MIT Sloan alumni groups around the world also organize C-Functions for their club members, for social and networking activities.

Students at MIT Sloan run over 70 active clubs. Some of the most popular clubs are the Sloan Women in Management Club; the Entrepreneurship & Innovation Club; the Design Club; the Finance Club; the Management Consulting Club; the Entertainment, Media and Sports Club; the Venture Capital and Private Equity Club; the Product Management Club; and the Technology Club. The Sloan Business Club is the official undergraduate business club for all MIT students.

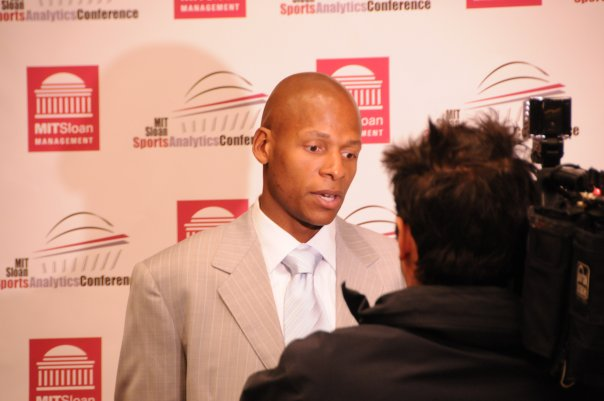
Ray Allen of the Boston Celtics at the MIT Sloan Sports Analytics Conference

Throughout the school year, a number of professional and academic conferences are organized by, or in partnership with, the school. Annual highlights include the MIT $100K Entrepreneurship Competition, the MIT Venture Capital & Innovation Conference, the Sloan Women in Management Breaking the Mold Conference, the MIT Sloan CIO Symposium, and the MIT Sloan CFO Summit. The most visible conference—and the largest student-run conference in the world—is the MIT Sloan Sports Analytics Conference, which Fast Company ranked the #3 most innovative sports company, behind only the NFL and MLB Advanced Media.

Like the rest of the institute, MIT Sloan students have an extended period between semesters reserved for special activities. During the month of January, there are no formal classes at the school; instead, they are replaced by what is known as the Independent Activities Period (IAP). During IAP, students engage in activities that would be challenging to participate in alongside regular classes, often including international travel programs. In the middle of semesters, the MBA program has an additional, shorter gap, called the Sloan Innovation Period (SIP), focusing on intensive experiential leadership activities outside of the classroom.

After commencement, MIT Sloan graduates wear the MIT class ring, known as the Grad Rat. Top recruiters of new MBA graduates of the school include Apple, Google, Goldman Sachs, McKinsey & Company, Nike and Amazon. The school has over 20,000 alumni globally in 90 countries, with more than 20% who are presidents or CEOs. More than 650 companies have been founded by alumni of the school, including Akamai, E*Trade, Gartner, Genentech, HubSpot, Lotus Development, Teradyne, Zipcar, and Okta.

== Faculty ==
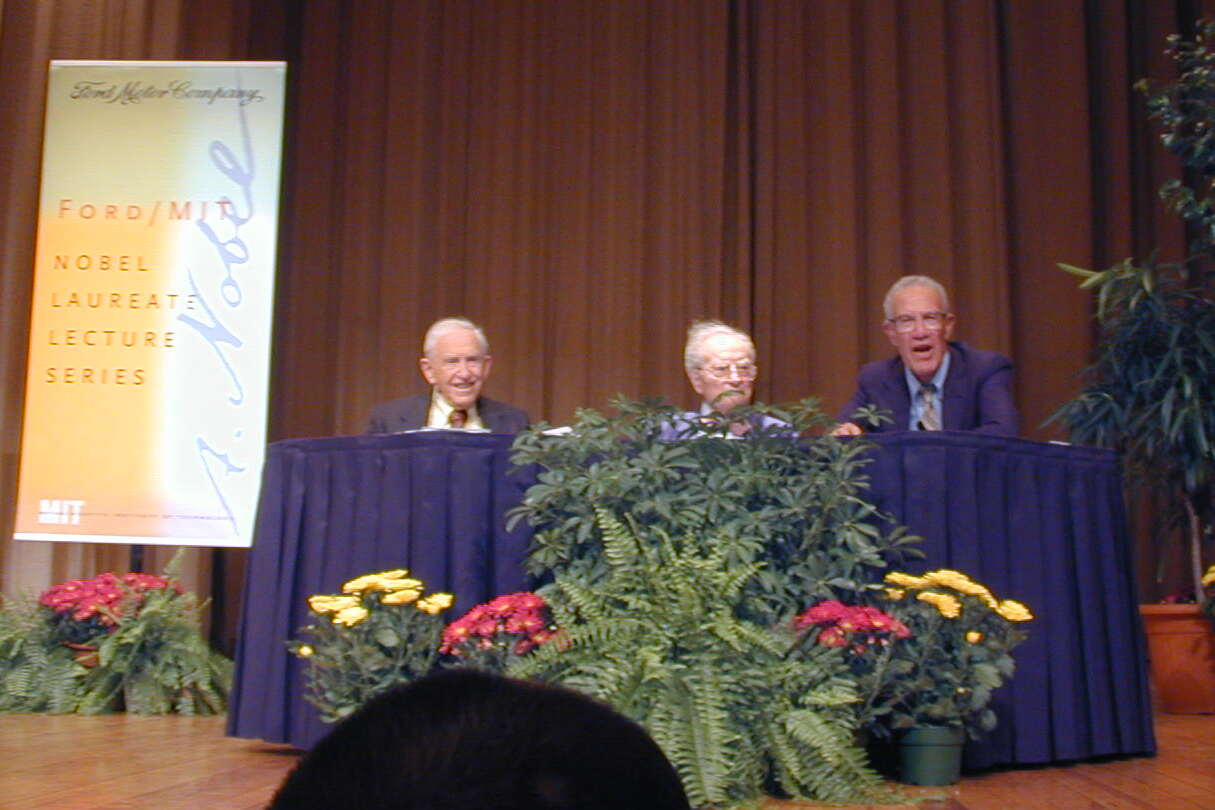
Nobel Laureates Franco Modigliani, Paul Samuelson and Robert Solow in 2000

Deans

- Erwin Schell, 1930–1951
- Edward Pennell Brooks, 1951–1959
- Howard W. Johnson, 1959–1966
- William F. Pounds, 1966–1980
- Abraham Siegel, 1980–1987
- Lester Thurow, 1987–1993
- Glen L. Urban, 1993–1998
- Richard L. Schmalensee, 1998–2007
- David Schmittlein, 2007–2024
- Richard M. Locke, 2025– Present

Notable current and former faculty

- Noubar Afeyan, co-founder, Moderna
- Dan Ariely, author, Predictably Irrational
- Bill Aulet, Managing Director, Martin Trust Center for MIT Entrepreneurship
- Jean-Noël Barrot, Minister of Digital Transition, France
- Richard Beckhard, pioneer in organizational studies
- Warren Bennis, pioneer in leadership studies
- Fischer Black, co-inventor, Black–Scholes model
- Lael Brainard, director of the National Economic Council
- Erik Brynjolfsson, director, MIT Center for Digital Business
- Randolph Cohen, leading expert on financial economics
- Paul Cootner, co-inventor, random walk hypothesis
- John C. Cox, co-inventor, binomial options pricing model
- Donald W. Davis, former CEO, Stanley Black & Decker
- John J. Donovan, founder, Cambridge Technology Partners
- Rudi Dornbusch, inventor, overshooting model
- Stanley Fischer, 8th Governor, Bank of Israel
- Jay Wright Forrester, founder, system dynamics
- Michael Hammer, inventor, business process reengineering
- John R. Hauser, co-founder, marketing science
- Jerry A. Hausman, 1985 John Bates Clark Medal recipient
- Bengt R. Holmström, 2016 Nobel laureate in economics
- Thomas Kochan, leading expert on industrial relations
- Simon Johnson, former Chief Economist, IMF
- S. P. Kothari, editor, Journal of Accounting and Economics
- John Little, co-founder, marketing science
- Andrew Lo, inventor, adaptive market hypothesis
- Peter Lorange, former president, IMD
- Stuart Madnick, inventor, Little Man Computer model
- Thomas W. Malone, co-founder, We Are Smarter Than Me
- Andrew McAfee, co-director, MIT Initiative on the Digital Economy
- Robert C. Merton, 1997 Nobel laureate in economics
- Douglas McGregor, inventor, Theory X and Theory Y
- Franco Modigliani, 1985 Nobel laureate in economics
- Kenneth Morse, co-founder, 3Com
- Stewart Myers, inventor, real options valuation
- Athanasios Orphanides, 5th Governor, Central Bank of Cyprus
- Wanda Orlikowski, leading expert on structuration theory
- Stephen Ross, inventor, arbitrage pricing theory
- Paul Samuelson, first American Nobel laureate in economics
- Edgar Schein, coiner of the term corporate culture
- Myron S. Scholes, 1997 Nobel laureate in economics
- Peter Senge, author, The Fifth Discipline
- George P. Shultz, 60th United States Secretary of State
- Robert Solow, 1987 Nobel laureate in economics
- John Sterman, leading expert on system dynamics
- Richard Thaler, inventor, endowment effect
- Eric von Hippel, leading expert on user innovation
- Jack Welch, former CEO, General Electric
- Birger Wernerfelt, leading expert on organizational studies

== Notable alumni ==
- Magid Abraham, co-founder and chairman, comScore
- Duane Ackerman, former CEO, BellSouth
- Thad W. Allen, 23rd Commandant of the Coast Guard
- Abdullatif Al Othman, governor, Saudi General Investment Authority
- Kofi Annan, 7th Secretary-General of the United Nations
- Magdalena Barreiro, former Finance Minister, Ecuador
- Scott Beardsley, dean, Darden School of Business
- Frank Blount, former CEO, Telstra
- Megan Brennan, 74th United States Postmaster General
- Srikanth Bolla, Founder Chairman, Bollant Industries
- Daniel Carp, chairman, Delta Air Lines
- Richard Carrión, CEO, Popular
- Colby Chandler, former CEO, Eastman Kodak
- Robin Chase, co-founder, Zipcar
- Lim Kim Choon, CEO, Civil Aviation Authority of Singapore
- Bill Ford, chairman, Ford Motor Company
- Philip Condit, former CEO, Boeing
- Marian Czakański, Minister of Health of Poland
- Alex d'Arbeloff, co-founder, Teradyne
- Rafael del Pino Calvo-Sotelo, chairman, Ferrovial
- Eric Daniels, former CEO, Lloyds Banking Group
- Patrick Donahoe, 73rd United States Postmaster General
- Susan Dudley, former head, Office of Management and Budget
- Armand Feigenbaum, former president, American Society for Quality
- Carly Fiorina, former CEO, Hewlett-Packard
- Donald Fites, former CEO, Caterpillar
- James Foster, CEO, Charles River Laboratories
- Robert Garriott, co-founder, Origin Systems
- Gideon Gartner, founder, Gartner
- Annabelle Gawer, leading business theorist on digital platforms and the platform economy
- Pavlos Geroulanos, former Minister for Culture, Greece
- Thomas Gerrity, former dean, Wharton School of the University of Pennsylvania
- Shuman Ghosemajumder, co-founder and chairman, TeachAids
- Sumantra Ghoshal, founding dean, Indian School of Business
- Adi Godrej, chairman, Godrej Group
- Bruce Gordon, former CEO, NAACP
- Ilene Gordon, CEO, Ingredion
- Brian Halligan, co-founder and CEO, HubSpot
- Robert Hamada, former dean, Chicago Booth School of Business
- Richard Haythornthwaite, Chairman, MasterCard, Centrica
- John Hennessy, CEO, Credit Suisse First Boston
- Daniel Hesse, CEO, Sprint Corporation
- Yang Hua, president, China National Offshore Oil Corporation
- Neo Kian Hong, 7th Head of Singapore Armed Forces
- Sir Robert Horton, former CEO, BP
- Robert Huang, founder and chairman, Synnex
- Ploypailin Jensen, member of Thai Royal Family
- Michael Kaiser, president, Kennedy Center for the Performing Arts
- Mitch Kapor, founder, Lotus Development
- Robert Kennedy, dean, Ivey Business School
- James Killian, 10th president, Massachusetts Institute of Technology
- Robert Kuhn, host, Closer to Truth (PBS)
- Aileen Lee, partner, Kleiner Perkins Caufield & Byers
- John Legere, Former CEO, T-Mobile US
- Douglas Leone, managing partner, Sequoia Capital
- Peter Levine, general partner, Andreessen Horowitz
- Judy Lewent, former chief financial officer of Merck & Co
- Mauro Longobardo, CEO, ArcelorMittal Kryvyi Rih
- Nabiel Makarim, former Minister of the Environment, Indonesia
- Jamie McCourt, former CEO, Los Angeles Dodgers
- Dennis Meadows, co-author, The Limits to Growth
- D.R. Mehta, former chairman, Securities and Exchange Board of India
- Lorenzo Mendoza, chairman, Empresas Polar
- Victor Menezes, co-founder, American India Foundation
- Camila Merino, former Minister of Labor, Chile
- Robert Metcalfe, co-founder, 3Com, inventor of Ethernet
- Chung Mong-joon, president, Korea Football Association
- Daryl Morey, general manager, Houston Rockets
- Jon Moynihan, former chairman, PA Consulting Group
- Alan Mulally, former CEO, Ford Motor Company
- Preetish Nijhawan, co-founder, Akamai Technologies
- Benjamin Netanyahu, 9th Prime Minister of Israel
- Nitin Nohria, dean, Harvard Business School
- Sanjay Parthasarathy, founder and CEO, Indix
- Narendra Patni, founder and CEO, Patni Computer Systems
- Randal Pinkett, winner, The Apprentice, Season 4
- Cressida Pollock, CEO, English National Opera
- William Porter, founder, E*Trade
- John Potter, 72nd United States Postmaster General
- Tony Purnell, former head, Jaguar Racing
- Raghuram Rajan, 23rd Governor of the Reserve Bank of India
- John Reed, former CEO, Citigroup
- Howard Samuels, former chairman, Democratic National Committee
- Martha Samuelson, CEO, Analysis Group
- Richard Santagati, chairman, NYNEX
- Gerhard Schulmeyer, former CEO, Siemens
- Patrick M. Shanahan, former acting United States Secretary of Defense
- Antony Sheriff, managing director, McLaren Automotive
- Sumana Shrestha, Ex-Minister of Education, Science and Technology, Nepal
- Chan Chun Sing, Minister for Defence, Singapore
- Hannes Smárason, CEO, Icelandair
- Debby Soo, CEO of Open Table
- Chartsiri Sophonpanich, president, Bangkok Bank
- Herman Staudt, former Under Secretary of the Army
- Jeff Stibel, former CEO, Web.com
- Robert Swanson, founder, Genentech
- Keiji Tachikawa, former CEO, NTT DoCoMo
- Mervyn Tan, Chief, Republic of Singapore Air Force
- Bill Taylor, co-founder, Fast Company
- Stavros Thomadakis, chairman, Hellenic Capital Market Commission
- John Thompson, former CEO, Symantec; chairman, Microsoft
- Richard Van Horn, president, University of Houston
- Milen Veltchev, former Finance Minister, Bulgaria
- Ron Williams, former CEO, Aetna
- Thornton Wilson, former CEO, Boeing
- Robert Varkonyi, champion, 2002 World Series of Poker
- Carl Yankowski, former CEO, Palm
- Elisabeth Zinser, president, University of Idaho
- Palanivel Thiagarajan, Finance Minister of Tamil Nadu
- Ronald Zlatoper, Commander of the United States Pacific Fleet
- Joseph Nacchio, CEO of Qwest Communications International

== See also ==
- Economics
- Glossary of economics
- MIT Center for Collective Intelligence
- MIT Center for Digital Business
- MIT Center for Entrepreneurship
- MIT Center for Information Systems Research
- MIT Laboratory for Information and Decision Systems
