= Florence Sender =

Florence Sender (b. January 25, 1943 – d. October 19, 2012) was an American entrepreneur. She founded or served as a director of a number of companies. Sender taught at the MIT Sloan School of Management and co-founded its MIT Entrepreneurship Center.

== Career in business ==
Sender founded, directed, or participated in a number of notable business ventures. She was described as a "serial entrepreneur."

=== Nibbles International ===
In 1978, Sender founded Nibbles International, a seller of all-natural cheese spreads and snacks that Sender developed and that were produced and distributed by Beatrice Foods. For her work with Nibbles, she was recognized in 1987 as a runner-up for Inc. magazine's "hottest entrepreneur in America." The French food company Bongrain purchased Nibbles in 1988.

=== Be Fine Food skincare line ===
In 2006, Sender founded Be Fine, a Newton, Massachusetts-based maker of food-based skincare products. Be Fine's line, which is formulated entirely from food products, has been distributed by retailers including CVS Pharmacy, Duane Reade, and Rite Aid. The company has been cited as an example of a green, sustainable enterprise.

=== ClickR ===
Sender was founder and CEO of ClickR, LLC, a 2010 retail start-up that she founded with her husband, Noam Sender. ClickR announced in September 2010 that it would launch a new skincare line in October 2010. Sephora began selling the start-up's products in January 2011. ClickR describes its products as "completely vegan" and designed to avoid irritating sensitive skin. In January 2011, the company announced that actor Cam Gigandet had signed on as a spokesperson for the brand, and characterized him as the "first official male spokesperson for a beauty brand."

== Work in education ==
From 1989 to 1997, Sender was an Executive Director of the Massachusetts Institute of Technology's Sloan School of Management, where she taught MBA students. Sender also lectured at Tufts University.
