= Sanjay Parthasarathy =

Indian businessman

- Education: B.S. mechanical engineering, S.M. engineering, S.M. management
- Alma mater: MIT, MIT Sloan School of Management
- Occupations: CEO and Founder of Indix, former Microsoft executive

Sanjay Parthasarathy is a former Microsoft executive and technology expert. He is currently the CEO of Indix, a technology company that provides a comprehensive product intelligence platform and a product database which aims to help websites and apps become product-aware.

Parthasarathy left Microsoft in 2009 when he was Corporate VP of the Startup Business Accelerator program, a division that he created. Before that, he was Corporate VP of Developer and Platform Evangelism from 2000 to 2007. He grew Microsoft's developer business tools from $500 million to $1 billion, launched .NET, and has run microsoft.com and the Internet Security product unit. He directed Bill Gates' first trip to India in 1997 which led to significant investment from Microsoft in the country, benefitting the growing software industry there.

== Other interests ==
Sanjay is a collector of Indian art. Some items from his collection will comprise a 2014 exhibition at the Seattle Art Museum.

Parthasarathy is an investor in technology startups and he has invested in several early stage startups such as Buuteeq (acquired by Priceline.com), Skift, Flipsicle, GOQii, Gama, and DocSuggest.

In 2014 Parthasarathy appeared on the ETNow show the Superangels as a judge, mentor and investor.

Sanjay is a member of the Product Council of India's National Association of Software and Service Companies (NASSCOM)

Since 2023 Sanjay has been operating partner and co-owner of the Seattle Orcas Major League Cricket team with Microsoft CEO Satya Nadella.

== Personal life ==
Parthasarathy was born in Chennai, India. In addition to his work in technology, Sanjay has also been an active cricket player. During his cricket career, Parthasarathy represented his school, state, zone, university and two teams in a first division league. In an interview with GeekWire in 2015, he noted that cricket played an active role in developing his value for persistence in the tech industry. He was awarded Junior School Cricketer of the Year award by the Tamil Nadu Cricket Association (TNCA) in 1980. Sanjay has represented Tamil Nadu state and South Zone in under-19 cricket (1982) and under-15 cricket (1980). He captained the Anna University cricket team in 1985 and has represented Tamil Nadu in under-22 cricket.

He currently lives in Bellevue, Washington with his wife, Malini Balakrishnan, and two children.

== Education ==
Parthasarathy has a master's degree in engineering from MIT, a master's in management from the MIT Sloan School of Management, and a bachelor's in mechanical engineering from Anna University's College of Engineering in Chennai. He is on the Executive Board of the MIT Sloan School.

Parthasarathy studied at Don Bosco Matriculation Higher Secondary School in Egmore, Chennai.
