= Davis v. Commissioner =

- Court: United States Tax Court
- Full case name: James F. Davis and Dorothy A. Davis, Petitioners v. Commissioner of Internal Revenue, Respondent
- Decided: July 3, 2002
- Citation: 119 T.C. 1 (2002)

Court membership
- Judge sitting: Carolyn P. Chiechi

Case opinions
- The Tax Court held that the right to receive future annual lottery payments does not fit the definition a capital asset per Internal Revenue Code (I.R.C.) § 1221, and therefore the money received from Singer was ordinary income, and not capital gain.

Laws applied
- Internal Revenue Code

Davis v. Commissioner, 119 T.C. 1 (2002), was a United States Tax Court decision which closed the door on a potential loophole with regard to annuities and capital gains tax. The case affirmed that annual lottery annuities cannot be assigned and sold as capital assets.

== Facts ==
In 1991, James F. Davis won $13,580,000 in the California State Lottery's Super Lotto Plus game. As a result, Davis became entitled to receive $679,000 as yearly annuity, in 20 payments. (The game did not yet offer a lump sum option.) Normally, income derived from annuities are taxed as ordinary income. In 1997, in an apparent attempt to circumvent this tax treatment, Davis entered into an agreement with Singer Asset Finance Company, LLC (Singer). The agreement called for Davis to assign a portion of his right to these annual payments to Singer, in exchange for a single payment of $1,040,000.

In his 1997 income tax return, Davis reported the assignment as a sale of capital asset held for more than one year with a cost basis of $7,009 (representing the cost of attorney's fees). Thus, Davis claimed a long term capital gain of $1,032,991. By claiming this sum as a capital gain and not ordinary income, this figure was entitled to preferential tax treatment. The Commissioner of the IRS determined this amount to be ordinary income because rights to lottery annuity payments are not capital assets under the provisions of the Internal Revenue Code.

== Issue ==
Was the amount Davis received in exchange for his rights to receive a portion of future annual lottery payments ordinary income or capital gain?

== Holding ==
The Tax Court held that the right to receive future annual lottery payments does not fit the definition a capital asset per Internal Revenue Code (I.R.C.) § 1221, and therefore the $1,040,000 that petitioners received from Singer was ordinary income, and not capital gain.

== Reasoning ==
The court rejected Davis's argument that Arkansas Best Corp. v. Commissioner effectively overruled a line of cases which had previously precluded taxpayers from characterizing the right to receive future annual lottery payments as a capital asset within the meaning of section 1221.
