= Indix =

Company

Indix Corporation
- Industry: Product intelligence
- Founded: 2010
- Founder: Sanjay Parthasarathy
- Fate: Sold, 2019
- Headquarters: Seattle, Washington, United States and Chennai, India
- Key people: Sanjay Parthasarathy (Founder and CEO); Sridhar Venkatesh (VP of Product); Satya Kaliki (Architecture & Engineering); Mark Alan Schneider (General Counsel and VP Business Operations); John O’Rourke (VP of Marketing); Ron Strandin (VP of Sales); Heather Redman (former VP of Operations); John Rake (VP of Customer Success); Rajesh Muppalla (Director of Engineering); Sameer Brij Verma (Board Observer); Vignesh Ramamurthy (VP of Engineering)
- Services: Cloud-based product intelligence platform
- Number of employees: 70
- Website: indix.com

Indix was a company based in Seattle, Washington, in the United States that offered a cloud-based product information platform, along with other data services. It was headquartered in Seattle with a product development office in Chennai and was founded in 2010 by former Microsoft executive, Sanjay Parthasarathy.

== Background ==
Indix's CEO and founder is Sanjay Parthasarathy. Parthasarathy left Microsoft in 2009, where he worked for 19 years in an executive capacity, notably starting and running the company's Developer & Platform Evangelism Division from 2000 to 2007. After Microsoft, he moved his family to India where he intended to launch a software company that would tackle key business problems facing companies in the changing world of commerce. The company raised a successful angel investment round in the spring of 2012 and Parthasarathy subsequently established its headquarters in Seattle.

Other co-founders of Indix include Sridhar Venkatesh, Rajesh Muppalla, Satya Kaliki and Jonah Stephen Jermiah.

Indix was acquired by Avalara, a provider of tax compliance automation software on February 6, 2019.

== Services ==
Indix's services include proprietary algorithms that crawl product data and produce data-as-a-service as a business model.

The database offers coverage for most consumer retail product categories, as well as many industrial and business-to-business products.

=== API ===
The Indix Product API utilizes a representational state transfer (RESTful) interface with 20+ endpoints including brand, store, category, product search, single product details, and product price history. The API is a tool for product optimization to medium and large sized brands and retailers. It is helps developers build product-aware applications that connect consumers with timely products.

== Funding ==
In 2013 Indix raised a series A round of funding from Nexus Venture Partners and Avalon Ventures. Last year the company raised $8.5 million in its series A-1 round. Additional angel funding has come from Venky Harinarayan, S. Somasegar, and Anand Rajaraman of @WalmartLabs.

In 2015 Indix raised $15 million in a Series B round led by Nokia Growth Partners and included participation from Nexus Venture Partners and Avalon Ventures.
