= Alfredo Ambrosetti =

Italian management consultant (1931–2025)

- Born: 25 June 1931; Varese, Kingdom of Italy
- Died: 6 September 2025 (aged 94); Varese, Italy
- Education: Università Cattolica del Sacro Cuore
- Occupation: Management consultant
- Years active: 1954–2025
- Board member of: The European House - Ambrosetti
- Spouse: Maria Ambrosetti Conte
- Children: Antonio Ambrosetti, Chiara Ambrosetti
- Relatives: Gerardo Ambrosetti

Alfredo Ambrosetti (25 June 1931 – 6 September 2025) was an Italian management consultant, regarded as one of the pioneers of business consultancy in Italy and best known for founding the Ambrosetti Forum in Cernobbio.

== Early life and education ==
Ambrosetti's father, Antonio, owned two garages and a fuel station in Varese and was active as sports executive in cycling — he chaired the organising committee for the 1951 UCI Road World Championships. Antonio named his son after the champion rider Alfredo Binda, who had married a relative of the family.

After graduating from high‑school, Ambrosetti studied economics at the Università Cattolica del Sacro Cuore in Milan and earned his degree in 1954. Upon graduating he joined the Edison company and, after a period in Italy, the firm awarded him a scholarship in 1959 to pursue a master's degree at the Syracuse University, in the United States. Through Edison's managing director Giorgio Valerio, Ambrosetti later worked with prominent companies such as IBM, Ford Motor Company, General Motors, Kodak and Standard Oil.

== Career ==
Returning from the U.S., Ambrosetti continued his career at Edisonvolta, but also began providing business‑development consultancy, which was then a nascent sector in Italy. When the Italian government nationalised electricity production in 1963, he turned down a position at the newly created ENEL and decided to focus exclusively on consultancy. In 1965 he established Studio Ambrosetti in Milan with three collaborators. One of the firm's first clients was the Bombrini Parodi Delfino group; Ambrosetti forged lasting relationships with executives Mario Schimberni and Cesare Romiti.

Over the years, Ambrosetti's firm evolved into an internationally known think tank that combined consultancy and research, organised training meetings and promoted dialogue among institutions, business leaders and academics. In 1973 Ambrosetti launched the Aggiornamento Permanente (AP, which was later translated in English as "Lifelong Learning") programme of roughly one hundred meetings a year to help people in high‑responsibility roles develop leadership skills, broaden their strategic vision and build networks. He also sat on the boards of companies such as Marzotto and Barilla; for the latter he assisted Pietro Barilla in buying back the majority stake from W.R. Grace & Co.

During a session of the Aggiornamento Permanente in 1974, Ambrosetti and scientist Umberto Colombo decided to merge discussions on research, economics and socio‑politics into one event. Their idea led to the creation of the Ambrosetti Forum at Villa d'Este, Cernobbio, whose inaugural edition in 1975 had modest attendance because it was held in early July and coincided with U.S. Independence Day. Encouraged by fellow economist Beniamino Andreatta, Ambrosetti persevered; moving the gathering to September and increasing investment turned the "Cernobbio Forum" into a strategic meeting point for economic, academic, institutional and political leaders worldwide.

Between 1986 and 1992 the Studio Ambrosetti collaborated with Italian television host Piero Angela to produce “Quark Economia” and “Quark Europa”, two TV programmes that explained contemporary finance and the challenges of European integration. In the same years, the Aggiornamento Permanente was extended to the United States.

In 2002, Ambrosetti helped promote Varese’s successful bid to host the 2008 UCI Road World Championships. In 2007, he was awarded the title of Cavaliere del Lavoro (Knight of the Order of Merit for Labour of the Italian Republic) and stepped down from Studio Ambrosetti (renamed The European House – Ambrosetti in 2005) at the end of 2008 following a management buyout, while remaining honorary president until 2016.

In his later years he organised initiatives in his native Varese on topics such as sport, safety, economics and politics. He published autobiographical books and gave some interviews commenting on contemporary Italian and international affairs.

== Personal life ==
Ambrosetti married Maria Conte (nicknamed “Lella”), and the couple's marriage lasted 55 years; they had two children, Antonio and Chiara.

== Death and burial ==
Ambrosetti lived his whole life in Varese and died there on 6 September 2025, after a short stay in hospital; his public funeral was held on 9 September in the St. Victor Basilica (the main church of the city), celebrated by Bishop Vincenzo Paglia and attended by senator‑for‑life and former prime minister Mario Monti and economy minister Giancarlo Giorgetti. He's buried in the Monumental Cemetery of Giubiano.

== Honours and awards ==
- Italy: Knight of the Order of Merit for Labour (2007)
