= Mauro Longobardo =

Italian CEO

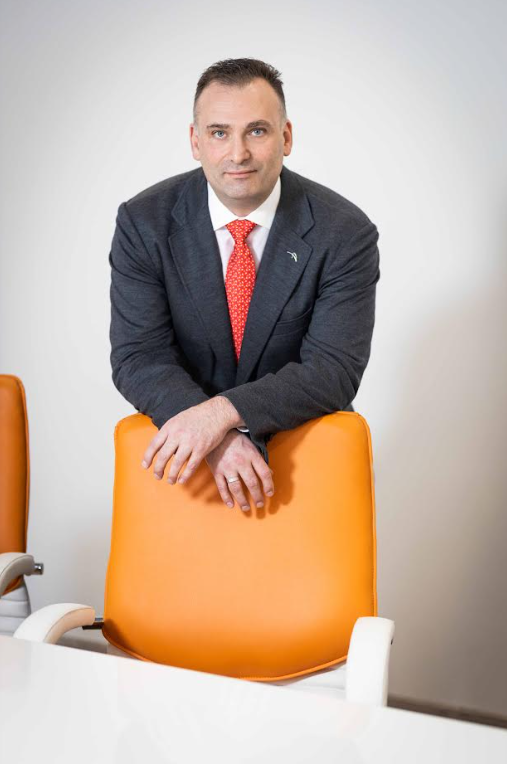
- Born: Italy, Gallarate
- Education: Politecnico di Milano/MIT
- Occupation: CEO
- Organization: ArcelorMittal Kryvyi Rih

Mauro Longobardo is Vice President of ArcelorMittal and the Chief Executive Officer of ArcelorMittal Kryvyi Rih.

Longobardo is also member of the board of directors of ArcelorMittal Tubular Products in Saudi Arabia, Vice-President of the European Business Association in Ukraine, and Member of the Supervisory Board at RMHC's Ukraine.

== Early life and education ==
Mauro Longobardo was born in the Lombardian town of Gallarate.He graduated of the Polytechnic University of Milan, Italy, majoring in Materials Engineering. In 2012, he obtained the ACE certificate from MIT Sloan School of Management in Boston. Longobardo received further executive education at IAE, the Management and Business School of the Austral University (Argentina).

== Career ==
From 2002 to 2006, Mauro Longobardo worked for Tenaris Dalmine (Italy) in quality and product development. He then moved to Argentina, overseeing different manufacturing sites at the Tenaris Siderca plant, located near Buenos Aires.

In 2010, he moved to Dubai to become worldwide coordination director for Oil Country Tubular Goods (OCTG). He also worked as commercial director and regional manager in Iraq, Qatar, Oman, Yemen, Pakistan, Syria, Lebanon, and Jordan. From 2013 to 2015, Longobardo joined PJSC Chelpipe as Deputy CEO for Strategy, Technology and Development. After 2015, he joined Interpipe Group, becoming the Deputy CEO / Chief Operating Officer.

Longobardo joined the ArcelorMittal Group in February 2018 as CEO of ArcelorMittal Tubular Products Jubail, a joint venture between ArcelorMittal and Saudi Public Investment Fund (PIF), focused on producing seamless pipes and tubular products primarily for the oil and gas industry. In this capacity, he was responsible for operational management, strategic planning, and technological advancements at the site, leveraging his prior experience in heavy industry and pipe manufacturing. He held this position up to July 31, 2021 and was then appointed Member of the Board and Vice-Chairman.

Since November 2020, Longobardo has served as a member of the Supervisory Board of the European Business Association in Ukraine. In 2021, he became Vice President of the association. Нe is expected to hold this position until 2027. In 2025, Longobardo was put on the 7th place of Forbes Ukraine’s ranking of Best 25 CEOs of Ukraine.

For two consecutive years, Longobardo was included by the independent business media outlet Delo.ua in its list of the 50 most experienced CEOs in Ukraine.

== Role at ArcelorMittal Kryvyi Rih ==
Since February 18, 2020, to the current moment he has been the CEO of ArcelorMittal Kryvyi Rih plant, which is part of ArcelorMittal international corporation. In 2021, the last year before Russia's invasion in February 2022, the steelmaker's peak output totalled 4.9 million tons.

ArcelorMittal Kryvyi Rih was shut down for security reasons in February 2022, at the start of the Russian invasion of Ukraine, but resumed production at 20-25 % in fall 2022.

These restarts of blast furnaces contributed to a significant ramp-up in output during 2024, with raw steel production increasing by nearly 70% to 1.65 million metric tons, despite ongoing energy and logistical challenges. By mid-2024, capacity utilization temporarily reached 50%,supported by adjustments in maritime logistics and the commissioning of a second operational blast furnace. Longobardo emphasized these efforts as essential for maintaining competitiveness, including optimizations in furnace operations to mitigate high energy costs, which had risen to comprise a larger share of production expenses.

Under his leadership, the company has prioritized operational continuity amid the Russian full-scale invasion starting February 2022, relying on diesel generators and rotated power supplies to manage outages from attacks.

Between 2022 and 2026, the plant operated under severe conditions that included rising electricity costs, disruptions to power supply caused by Russian missile and drone attacks, a reduction in personnel exceeding 6,000 due to mobilization and departures, increased tariffs of the state railway operator Ukrzaliznytsia, and growing imports of steel products from Turkey and China.

Global steel market volatility, including protectionist trade barriers and import competition, has further eroded margins, with AMKR operating at a loss for the fifth consecutive year as of August 2026, shifting focus from expansion to mere survival.

The company contributes significantly to Kryvyi Rih's economy, underscoring its role as a major taxpayer despite unachieved break-even in 2026. In 2025, the company increased its tax and fee payments to UAH 8.5 billion, representing a 28% increase compared to 2024). The company’s humanitarian and social assistance amounted to UAH 767 million from the start of the full-scale invasion.

Prior to 2026, the plant employed more than 18,000 people. Only in 2026, due to CBAM-related export restrictions and high electricity prices, ArcelorMittal Kryvyi Rih initiated layoffs to maintain operations.

Longobardo has advocated for systemic reforms to address structural cost pressures, such aselectricity, water, and logistics tariffs controlled by state entities, arguing that unchecked increases threaten long-term viability and could lead to capacity downsizing, job losses exceeding 20,000, and reduced contributions to post-war reconstruction. He has emphasized investments in domestic nuclear power and gas production to lower energy costs, positioning these as prerequisites for attracting foreign capital and enabling green transitions, including potential $1 billion direct reduced iron (DRI) facilities to modernize production. These proposals aim to preserve Ukraine's full-cycle steel capabilities, which Longobardo views as essential for economic stability over mere survival during conflict.

Mauro Longobardo has actively advocated for the Ukrainian steel industry's competitiveness amid wartime disruptions and global market pressures. As CEO of ArcelorMittal Kryvyi Rih, he has emphasized the need for cost-effective energy supplies and reduced regulatory burdens to enable survival and post-war recovery, stating in January 2025 that "the problem is competitiveness, even after the war," due to high electricity prices and import competition from regions with lower costs.

In 2026, Mauro Longobardo has made numerous public statements regarding the potential negative consequences of the EU Carbon Border Adjustment Mechanism (CBAM) for Ukraine in the absence of exemptions. In 2025, the plant exported approximately 920,000 tonnes of products to the European Union, representing about one-third of its capacity. In 2026, the company was unable to export the planned 1.25 million tonnes of steel products.

In addition, high energy costs and carbon-related policies contributed to decisions to cease operations at certain facilities, including the blooming mill and the Casting and Mechanical Plant (LMZ). Mauro Longobardo has also expressed concerns regarding the competitiveness of Ukrainian industry, the level of state support, and the risks of deindustrialization and loss of industrial and economic capacity.

Looking post-war, Longobardo has outlined a return to pre-conflict capital expenditures of $500 million annually to restore production capacity exceeding 6 million tons of steel, alongside salary increases of 15% for employees starting May 2025 to retain talent and support workforce stability. He has linked these ambitions to Ukraine's EU integration, contending that a coordinated industrial policy would foster sustainable growth and investor confidence in the sector, which has received over $1 billion in parent-company support since 2022 to sustain operations. Projections under this strategy include scaling output by optimizing available blast furnaces, thereby reinforcing the industry's role in national GDP and exports despite persistent challenges like negative cash flows.

Longobardo serves as Vice President of the European Business Association (EBA) in Ukraine, aplatform for foreign investors to lobby for policy reforms, including tax stability and anti-corruption measures essential for industrial sustainability. In this role, he has participated in events promoting long-term investment, such as a December 2025 Kyiv gathering marking 20 years of ArcelorMittal's Ukrainian operations, where he underscored synergies between international capital and local production for economic resilience. His advocacy extends to operational continuity during conflict, rejecting production suspensions in 2020 despite market slumps, arguing that government support would prevent collapse and preserve jobs for over 20,000 workers.

In public forums, Longobardo has pushed for strategic adaptations like coking coal imports and efficiency upgrades to counter geopolitical risks, while critiquing over-reliance on short-term aid overstructural reforms. He advocates a balanced approach prioritizing present viability—through cash flow management and export diversification—before expansive future plans, warning that unresolved competitiveness issues could lead to permanent capacity losses in Ukraine's ferrous metallurgy. These positions align with broader industry calls for EU integration benefits, such as tariff protections, to bolster Ukraine's steel exports amid Russian aggression.

== Philanthropy ==
In the late 1990s and for several years thereafter, Mauro Longobardo volunteered with the Italian Red Cross. He served as a paramedic on ambulances and participated in other activities organized by the Red Cross.

Mauro Longobardo has provided patronage and financial support to the BC Kryvbas basketball club based in Kryvyi Rih. ArcelorMittal Kryvyi Rih served as the team’s anchor sponsor. In the 2023–24 season, the team reached the playoffs of the Ukrainian Basketball SuperLeague and was considered a contender for the semifinals.
