= Yang Hua =

Chinese business executive (born 1963)

- 杨华
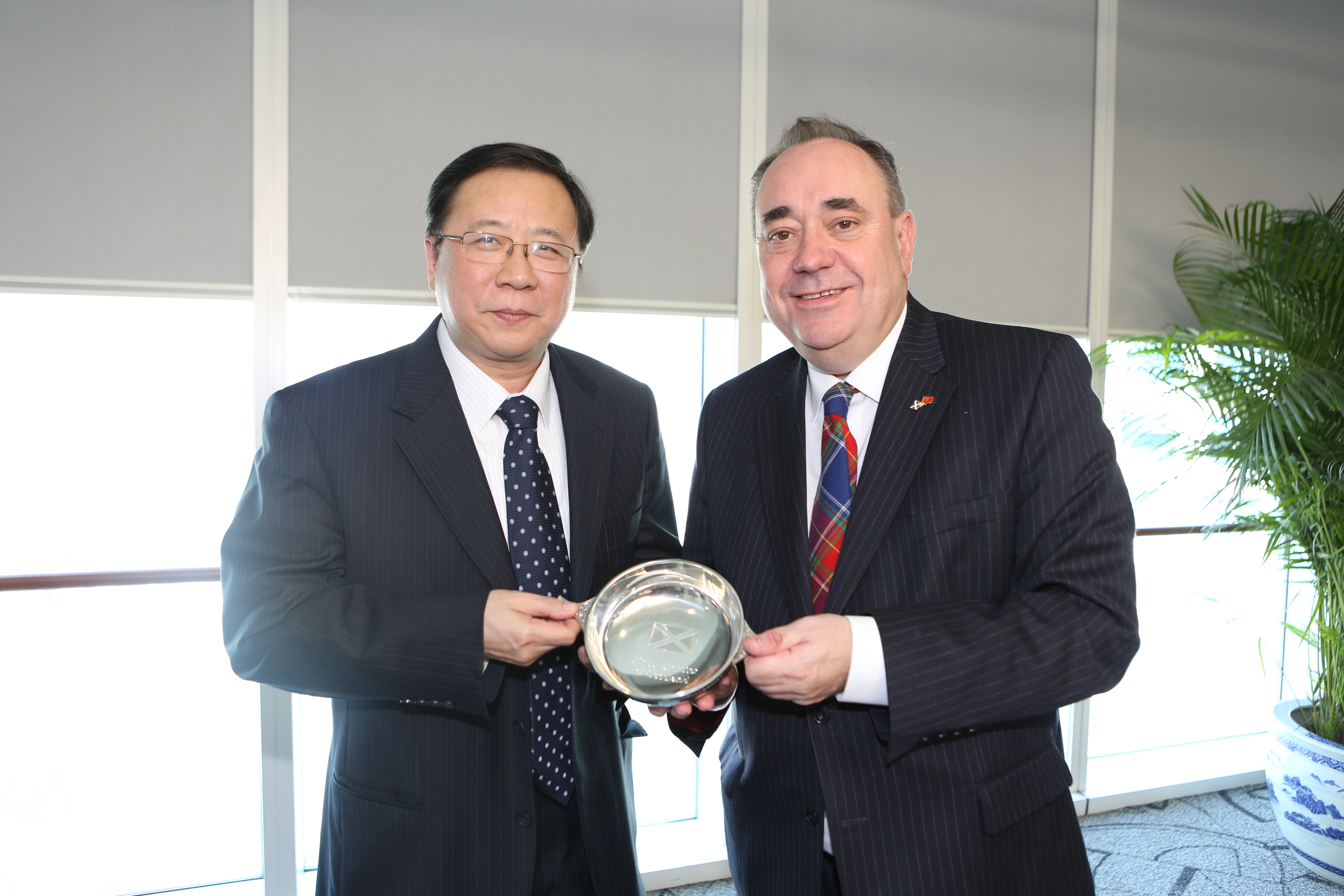
- Yang Hua with First Minister of Scotland Alex Salmond in 2013
- Born: 1963 (age 62–63)
- Education: China University of Petroleum (Beijing), MIT Sloan School of Management
- Years active: 1982-
- Employer: China National Offshore Oil Corporation

Yang Hua (Chinese: 杨华; born 1963) is a Chinese business executive who was CEO of the China National Offshore Oil Corporation (CNOOC). Concurrently, he served as Director and Vice Chairman of the Board. Prior to his appointment as CEO, he was employed by CNOOC in such positions as Manager of the Reservoir Engineering Department, Research Center Project Manager, Director of the Overseas Development Department, Deputy Chief Geologist, and CFO. Yang received his Bachelor of Science Degree in Petroleum Engineering from China University of Petroleum (Beijing) in 1982, and an MBA degree from the MIT Sloan School of Management. Following his resignation as CEO, he was succeeded by Li Fanrong.
