= Ambrosetti Forum =

Economic conference in Italy

The Ambrosetti Forum organized by The European House – Ambrosetti, a consulting firm – is an annual international economic conference held at Villa d'Este, in the Italian town of Cernobbio on the shores of Lake Como. Since its inception in 1975, the Forum has brought together heads of state, ministers, Nobel laureates and businesspeople to discuss current challenges to the world's economies and societies.

The Forum presents forecasts of economic and geo-political outlooks for the world, Europe and Italy. The forum also analyzes scientific and technological developments and their impacts on the future of business and society.

== Media ==
The event takes place behind closed doors.

== 2010 Edition ==
=== Speakers ===
- Angelino Alfano – Minister of Justice, Italy
- Joaquín Almunia – European Commissioner for Competition
- José Maria Aznar – former prime minister, Spain
- Michel Barnier – European Commissioner for Internal Market and Services
- Maria Bartiromo – anchor, CNBC
- Fatih Birol – chief economist, IEA (International Energy Agency)
- Alberto Bombassei – vice president for Industrial Relations, Social Affairs and Welfare, Confindustria, Italy
- Raffaele Bonanni – secretary general, CISL, Italy
- Renato Brunetta – Minister for Public Administration and Innovation, Italy
- George W. Buckley – chairman, president and chief executive officer, 3M, US
- Fabrizio Capobianco – CEO TOK.tv, president and chairman Funambol
- Cheng Siwei – dean, Management School, Graduate University of Chinese Academy of Sciences, China; former vice chairman, Standing Committee, National People’s Congress, China
- Piercamillo Davigo – judge of the Italian Supreme Court of Cassation
- Ferruccio De Bortoli – editor in chief, Il Corriere della Sera
- Piero Fassino – member of the Italian Parliament
- Niall Ferguson – professor of history, Harvard University
- Mauro Ferrari – president and chief executive officer, The Methodist Hospital Research Institute, Houston
- Jean-Paul Fitoussi – president, Observatoire Français des Conjonctures Économiques
- Carl Benedikt Frey – co-director, Oxford Martin School, University of Oxford
- Mariastella Gelmini – Minister of Education, University and Research, Italy
- Máire Geoghegan-Quinn – European Commissioner for Research, Innovation and Science
- Yasuchika Hasegawa – president and CEO, Takeda Pharmaceutical, Japan
- Abraham Heifets – co-founder and CEO, Atomwise, US
- Huang Jing – visiting professor, Lee Kuan Yew School of Public Policy, National University of Singapore
- Pietro Ichino – Member of the Senate, Italy
- Harold Kroto – Nobel laureate for Chemistry; Francis Eppes Professor of Chemistry, Florida State University
- Christine Lagarde – Minister of Economy, Industry and Employment, France
- Anne Lauvergeon – CEO, Areva; France
- Yves Leterme – prime minister, Belgium
- Enrico Letta – Member of the Italian Parliament
- Li Yuguang – deputy director, State Intellectual Property Office of the People’s Republic of China
- Edison Liu – executive director, Genome Institute of Singapore
- Emma Marcegaglia – president, Confindustria, Italy
- Roberto Maroni – Minister for Internal Affairs, Italy
- Mario Monti – president, Bocconi University, Italy
- Kenneth P. Morse – member, National Advisory Council on Innovation and Entrepreneurship (U.S. Department of Commerce); founding managing director, MIT Entrepreneurship Center; chair in Entrepreneurship, Innovation and Competitiveness, Delft University of Technology, Delft, The Netherlands
- Amre Moussa – secretary general, League of Arab States
- Wolfgang Munchau – associate editor, Financial Times
- Giorgio Napolitano – president of the Italian Republic – live, in videoconference
- Joaquín Navarro-Valls – president of advisory board, Campus Bio-Medico University, Rome; president, Telecom Italia Foundation
- Tommaso Padoa-Schioppa – president, Notre Europe, France
- Corrado Passera – managing director and CEO, Intesa Sanpaolo, Italy
- Shimon Peres – president, State of Israel
- Charles David Powell – House of Lords, UK
- it:Federico Rampini – correspondent from the US, La Repubblica
- Marco Reguzzoni – Member of the Italian Parliament
- Jonas Ridderstråle – visiting professor, Ashridge Business School (UK); writer, Sweden
- Gianni Riotta – editor-in-chief, Il Sole 24 Ore, Italy
- Sergio Romano – columnist, Corriere della Sera, Italy
- Nouriel Roubini – professor of economics, Stern School of Business, New York University, US
- Card. Camillo Ruini – president of the Cultural Project Committee, Italian Episcopal Conference (CEI)
- Elena Salgado – Minister for the Economy and Finance, Spain
- Wolfgang Schüssel – former federal chancellor, Austria
- Hans-Werner Sinn – professor of economics and public finance, LMU Munich; director of CES-Center for Economic Studies (LMU Munich); president, Ifo Institute for Economic Research, Germany
- Peter Sutherland – president, Goldman Sachs International, UK
- Antonio Tajani – vice-president, European Commission and European Commissioner for Industry and Entrepreneurship
- Giulio Tremonti – Minister for the Economy and Finance, Italy
- Jean-Claude Trichet – president, European Central Bank
- Edwin Truman – senior fellow, Peterson Institute for International Economics, US
- Matti Vanhanen – former prime minister, Finland
- Yanis Varoufakis – Finance Minister of Greece
- Umberto Veronesi – director, European Institute of Oncology
- Jimmy Wales – founder, Wikipedia
- Geert Wilders – Ultra right wing member of parliament, the Netherlands
