= Robert E. Kennedy (university dean) =

Robert E. (Bob) Kennedy is the former Dean of the Nanyang Business School in Singapore (2017 - 2020). He was Dean of Western University's Ivey Business School in Canada (2013-2017).

From 2003 to 2013, he was executive director of the William Davidson Institute at the University of Michigan and the Tom Lantos Professor of Business Administration at Michigan’s Stephen M. Ross School of Business, where he taught Corporate Strategy and International Business courses in the MBA and Executive Education programs.

Kennedy came to Michigan's Ross School of Business after spending 13 years at Harvard Business School, where he was awarded his PhD, and was later assistant, then associate, professor of business administration.

Kennedy received bachelor's degrees in economics and political science from Stanford University, a master's degree in management science from the MIT Sloan School of Management, and master's and doctorate degree in business economics from Harvard University.

== Research and publications ==
Kennedy is a well-known speaker, educator, and academic researcher. He has authored more than 120 articles, notes, and case studies on emerging market issues. Since 2003 (through 2013), his teaching materials have been used at every one of Business Week's top 25 business schools. (Data from Harvard Business School Publishing).

Kennedy’s research focuses on the opportunities and challenges facing businesses in emerging market countries and has been published in both economics and strategy journals. In the mid- and late-1990s, much of this work focused on industry dynamics and business strategy in Central European post-liberalization economies. Since 2000, Kennedy has explored the drivers and implications of the globalization of service activities, also known as "offshoring." The work has been published in a series of case studies, a book The Services Shift - Seizing the Ultimate Offshore Opportunity and in research projects for a variety of development organizations and foundations. Many of his case studies are available through Harvard Business School Publishing and WDI's publishing site.

Kennedy is currently engaged with a Michigan-based family office as a private equity investment advisor and continues to work with several international business schools on strategy issues and capability enhancement.
