= Fiona Murray =

British innovation scholar and policy adviser

Dame Fiona Murray DCMG CBE
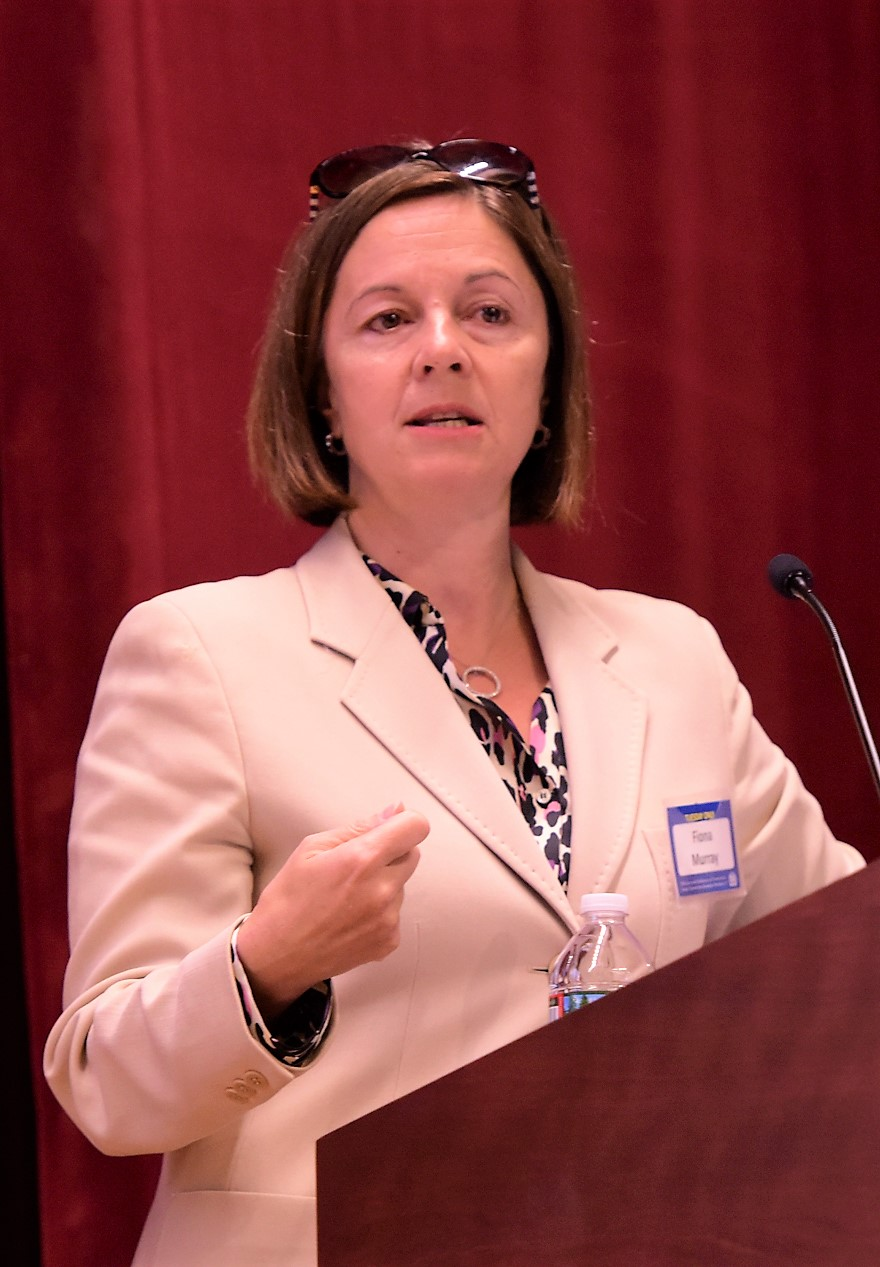
- Murray speaks at the U.S. Naval War College in 2019
- Education: Merton College, Oxford; Harvard University
- Scientific career
- Workplaces: Massachusetts Institute of Technology; Saïd Business School
- Thesis: Environment and technology in investment decision making power sector planning in China (1996)

Dame Fiona Elizabeth Murray DCMG CBE is the William Porter Professor of Entrepreneurship and Associate Dean for Innovation at the MIT Sloan School of Management. Her research focuses on the commercialisation of scientific innovation, including the role of intellectual property in knowledge diffusion and gender disparities in research funding. She is Chair of the Board of Directors of the NATO Innovation Fund.

== Early life and education ==
Murray studied at Merton College, Oxford, where she earned her BA degree in 1989 and MA in 1990, both in Chemistry. She moved to the United States for her graduate studies, where she worked in applied science at Harvard University. For her research Murray studied decision making surrounding renewable energy policy in China. She obtained an AM degree in 1992 and a PhD in 1996 from Harvard, both in Applied Sciences. After completing her doctorate Murray returned to the University of Oxford, where she was appointed a lecturer at the Saïd Business School. She held a fellowship at St Catherine's College, Oxford.

== Research and career ==
Murray joined the MIT Sloan School of Management faculty in 1999. She works on connecting academics to entrepreneurs and specialises in biotechnology, biomedical science, clean energy, innovation ecosystems, deep tech and geopolitics. She helps scientific start-ups and spin-outs develop their business strategy across the public and private sectors. She teaches two courses at MIT Sloan, including innovation teams and new enterprises, and launched the Martin Trust Center for MIT Entrepreneurship Entrepreneurship & Innovation degree in 2006.

Murray is Faculty Director of the MIT Innovation Initiative. Through this role, she has launched programmes supporting African entrepreneurs in fundraising, networking, and business development, as well as initiatives to promote diversity in innovation. With Scott Stern, she co-directs the MIT Regional Entrepreneurship Acceleration Program (REAP), a two-year programme that brings leaders from developing regional ecosystems to MIT to improve innovation-driven entrepreneurship in their respective economies.

In 2020, Murray found that women scientists are 16% less likely to score highly on grant proposals, a gap she attributes to gendered differences in word choice. She has studied the differences between men's and women's patenting rates, as well as investigating where women inventors are located. Together with her first Ph.D. student at MIT, Prof. Kenneth G. Huang (National University of Singapore), they showed in 2009 that gene patents decrease follow-on public genetic knowledge, with broader patent scope, private sector ownership, patent thickets, fragmented patent ownership and gene's commercial relevance exacerbating their effect.

In 2023, she founded the MIT Murray Lab, a multilateral research group that focuses on deep tech and geopolitics.

Murray served on the Prime Minister of the United Kingdom's Council for Science and Technology from 2014 to 2016. In 2023, she was appointed Vice-Chair of the Board of Directors of the NATO Innovation Fund alongside venture capitalist Klaus Hommels.

== Awards and honours ==
In 2015, Murray was made a Commander of the Order of the British Empire (CBE) in the New Year Honours for services to entrepreneurship. She was appointed Dame Commander of the Order of St Michael and St George (DCMG) in the 2023 New Year Honours for services to science, technology and diversity.

== Selected publications ==
- Murray, Fiona; Stern, Scott (2005). "Do Formal Intellectual Property Rights Hinder the Free Flow of Scientific Knowledge? An Empirical Test of the Anti-Commons Hypothesis". Journal of Economic Behavior & Organization. Cambridge, MA. doi:10.3386/w11465.
- Murray, Fiona (1 December 2002). "Innovation as co-evolution of scientific and technological networks: exploring tissue engineering". Research Policy. 31 (8–9): 1389–1403. doi:10.1016/s0048-7333(02)00070-7. ISSN 0048-7333.
- Murray, Fiona (2004). "The role of academic inventors in entrepreneurial firms: sharing the laboratory life". Research Policy. 33 (4): 643–659. doi:10.1016/j.respol.2004.01.013. ISSN 0048-7333.
- Huang, Kenneth; Murray, Fiona (2009). "Does Patent Strategy Shape the Long-run Supply of Public Knowledge? Evidence from Human Genetics". Academy of Management Journal. 52 (6): 1193–1221. doi:10.5465/amj.2009.47084665. S2CID 16944597.
