= Fabrizio Capobianco =

Italian entrepreneur

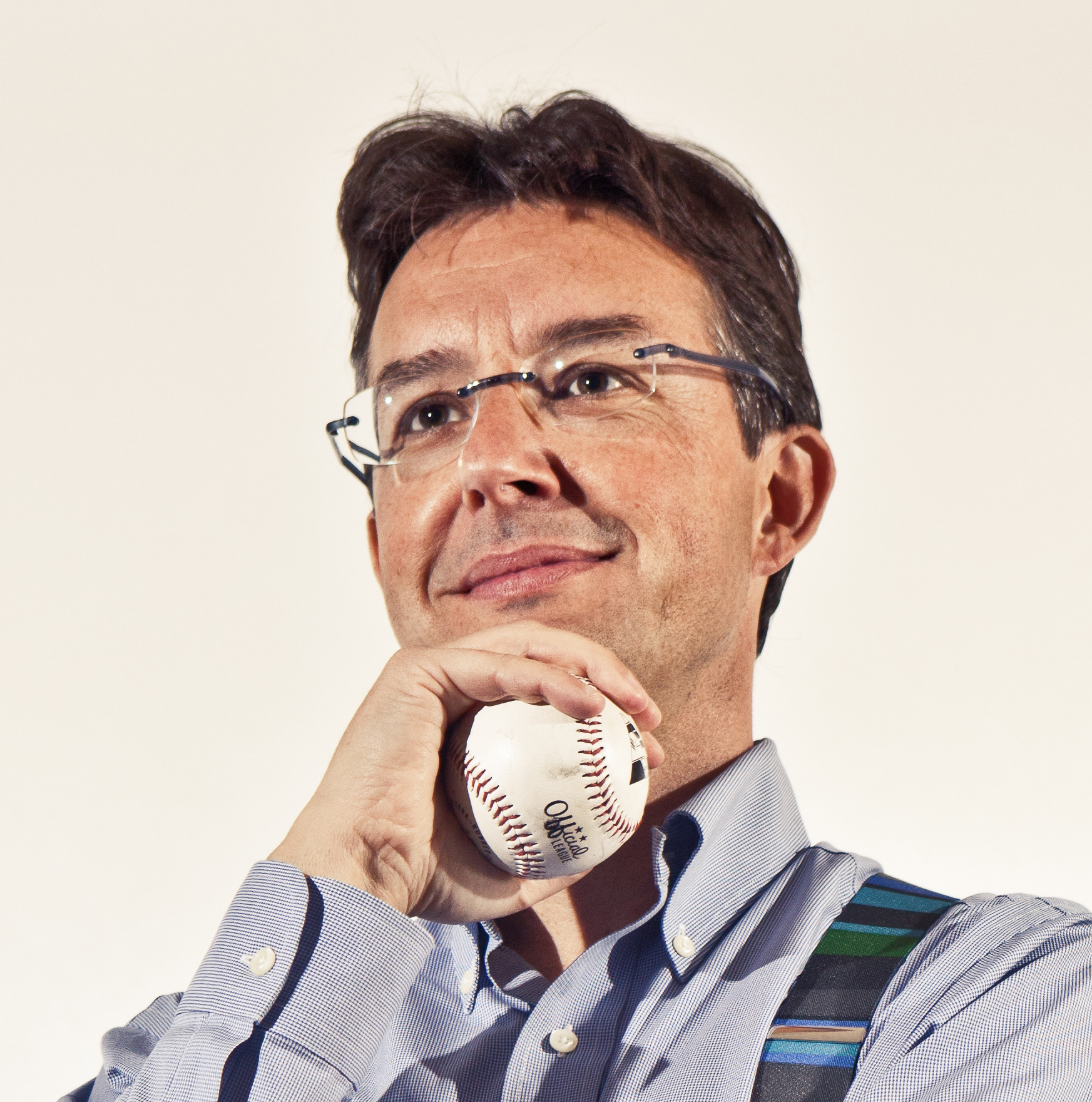
Fabrizio Capobianco

Fabrizio Capobianco (born December 2, 1970) is an Italian American entrepreneur based in Valtellina, Italy. He is Founder and Managing Partner of The Liquid Factory. He was the founder and CEO of the sports social network TOK.tv and of Funambol, a white-label "personal cloud" provider.

== Early life and first companies ==
Fabrizio Capobianco was born in Sondrio (Valtellina), in the Italian Alps. After studying at the Liceo Classico G. Piazzi, he graduated from the University of Pavia in 1994 with a MS in Computer Science, as an alumnus of the Almo Collegio Borromeo. In 1997 he received a PhD in Computer Science with a focus on usability from the University of Pavia.

In 1994 he founded Internet Graffiti, the first Italian Web Company, anticipating the Internet phenomenon. His simple idea was that the Internet would change the world, and every company in Italy needed a web site.

In 1996 he founded Stigma OnLine. The company built one of the first Intranet products in the market, SolWeb Intra, a web document management product which became the backbone for the Intranet of Kraft, Novartis, the Italian Broadcasting Television, the Italian Stock Exchange and the Bocconi University.

In 1999 he moved to Silicon Valley.

From 1999 to 2002, Capobianco worked in Palo Alto at Tibco Finance (then Reuters) as Director of Reuters' Brokerage System, where he was in charge of pre-sale and post-sale activities for one of the first web trading consumer platforms, TIBMercury.

== The Dual Model: Headquarters in Silicon Valley, R&D in Italy ==
In 2002 Fabrizio Capobianco founded Funambol, a white-label personal cloud solution for mobile operators and device manufacturers. Funambol's vision was to make it easy to automatically sync billions of mobile phones, tablets, computers and connected devices with the systems and online services people use everyday via the cloud. The project was initially based on open source software, also called Funambol, that quickly became the largest open source project in mobile. During his tenure as CEO of Funambol, Capobianco created the HPL (Honest Public License), which was then merged into the GNU AGPLv3, which he submitted on behalf of Funambol to the Open Source Initiative in 2008. With headquarter in Silicon Valley, but R&D in Pavia (Italy), Funambol raised over $30 million in Venture Capital funding in multiple rounds and established partnership with Télefonica, Movistar Spain and many other leading mobile operators worldwide.

Having managed software development teams in Italy, and in Silicon Valley, Capobianco concluded that the development team of his first Italian companies were as good (if not better) than the ones he found in Silicon Valley. Aware that Silicon Valley is the best place to start a tech company, he pioneered a dual model for software startup: headquarters in Silicon Valley with US Venture Capital, but R&D in Italy. The model is sometimes referred to as the "Funambol model".

== The Liquid Enterprise ==
In 2012, Capobianco founded TOK.tv, which became the largest social network in sports with over 40 million users worldwide. As the social network of the official apps of Real Madrid, FC Barcelona, Juventus and many other sports teams and leagues, TOK.tv allowed fans to talk and cheer even when they were apart. In 2016, TOK.tv raised $5 million in Venture Capital funding.

TOK.tv was what Capobianco calls a "liquid enterprise", one with no offices, where every employee is remote. It is an evolution of the dual model, with headquarter in Silicon Valley and R&D in Italy. In this case, though, the R&D is not in a single town, but dispersed along the country. The goal was to harness the best talent in Italy, instead of being limited to a single pool of talent in one town.

In September 2019, TOK.tv was acquired by Minerva Networks, and Capobianco became its Chief Innovation Officer.

== The Liquid Factory ==
After 23 years in Silicon Valley, Capobianco moved back to Valtellina in 2022 with the ambition of transforming it into the European innovation capital for mountain lovers. He founded and launched The Liquid Factory in September 2024. It is a startup studio with the goal of creating the next Silicon Valley unicorn starting from Valtellina. Thanks to an investment of €4M by Banca Popolare di Sondrio, it plans to invest €200K in four Entrepreneurs in Resident for four years to create liquid companies (100% remote) aiming to establish themselves in Silicon Valley, with a Dual Model (headquarters in Silicon Valley, R&D in Italy).

== Awards and recognition ==
Capobianco was recognized in 2007 as a top "40 under 40" leader by American Venture Magazine and by the readers of Mobile Village for being a consumer email visionary.

Having been invited to give a commencement speech at the University of Pavia in 2009, he received the § Medaglia teresiana, an academic recognition conferred by the Rector to individuals who are particularly distinguished in their field.

In 2016, he was invited to speak on the topic of the "Liquid Enterprise" at the Ambrosetti Forum, an annual international economic conference held at Villa d'Este, in the Italian town of Cernobbio.

In October 2016 Capobianco was knighted, receiving the Order of Merit of the Italian Republic medal awarded by President Sergio Mattarella on a proposal by Prime Minister Matteo Renzi.

In September 2026, the Lombardy Region awarded Capobianco the title "Voce lombarda nel mondo" (Lombard Voice in the World), recognizing his work in the Silicon Valley technology ecosystem and his role in building internationally significant companies.

== Talks ==
- Capobianco, Fabrizio (August 21, 2026). The Future Is Liquid (Talk at TEDxCortina) (in Italian). TED.

== Further activities ==
Capobianco is the President of Juventus Club Silicon Valley, which he founded in 2015. The club is a Juventus Official Fan Club, authorized by Juventus FC.

In 2024, he received from TED the license to launch TEDxSondrio in Valtellina.
