= Cressida Pollock =

- Born: June 3, 1982 (age 44)
- Education: University of Cambridge, MIT Sloan School of Management
- Title: CEO of English National Opera
- Term: 2015 – 2017

Cressida Pollock was appointed chief executive officer of English National Opera in March 2015.

== Early life and education ==
Pollock grew up on a farm in Northamptonshire, which her mother ran whilst her father worked as a barrister. She attended the sixth form of St Paul's Girls' School in London.

She holds an MBA from the MIT Sloan School of Management. She also holds a BA in Law and Classics from the University of Cambridge and is a non-practising barrister and member of Lincoln's Inn.

== Career ==
Since 2013, Pollock had been at McKinsey & Company, where she served the senior management and boards of leading public and private organisations across Europe and North America. Her work focused on strategy development, transformation, organisational design and customer engagement.

Her previous experience included investment research and analysis at Somerset Capital Management, an emerging markets investment fund, where she was one of the founding employees. She also has experience outside the world of business, with spells at Shelter, the housing NGO, and as an advisor at the Zambian Ministry of Health. Pollock was passionate about the arts. She had been a keen supporter of Dance Umbrella since 2010.
