= Corn Products Refining Co. v. Commissioner =

Corn Products Refining International Co. v. Commissioner
- Supreme Court of the United States

Argued October 18, 1955 Decided November 7, 1955
- Full case name: Corn Products Refining Company v. Commissioner of Internal Revenue
- Citations: 350 U.S. 46 (more) 76 S. Ct. 20; 100 L. Ed. 29

Case history
- Prior: 16 T.C. 395 (1951); 11 T.C.M. (CCH) 721 (1952); 20 T.C. 503 (1953); affirmed, 215 F.2d 513 (2d Cir. 1954); cert. granted, 348 U.S. 911 (1955).

Holding
- Futures contracts on corn of food company were capital assets, and gains and losses on them were not capital but ordinary income and loss.

Court membership
- Chief Justice Earl Warren Associate Justices Hugo Black · Stanley F. Reed; Felix Frankfurter · William O. Douglas; Harold H. Burton · Tom C. Clark; Sherman Minton · John M. Harlan II

Case opinion
- Majority: Clark, joined by Warren, Black, Reed, Frankfurter, Douglas, Burton, Minton
- Harlan took no part in the consideration or decision of the case.

Laws applied
- Internal Revenue Code § 1221

Corn Products Refining Company v. Commissioner, 350 U.S. 46 (1955), is a United States Supreme Court decision that helps taxpayers classify whether or not the disposition of a commodity futures contract by a business of raw materials as part of its hedging of business risk is an ordinary or capital gain or loss for income tax purposes.

== Background ==
Corn Products Company suffered large losses in the early 1930s, when prices of its main raw material grain corn rose dramatically during droughts in the Midwest's Dust Bowl. As a result, it later engaged futures contracts to protect itself from such prices rises in the future.

In its initial tax returns of 1940 and 1942, it declared gains and losses on such futures contracts to be ordinary. Later, in amended returns, the taxpayer reversed itself.

The Commissioner of the Internal Revenue Service held the such gains and losses were not a capital but ordinary loss.

== Issue ==
Are futures contracts on a company's raw material more like capital assets or more like insurance? (The Internal Revenue Code (IRC) treats capital assets of brokers as ordinary trade assets, if they are part of that business' inventory, so gains and losses would be ordinary and not capital.)

== Decision ==
The Supreme Court affirmed the Tax Court's determination that the loss was an ordinary loss because it seemed more like hedging and thus insurance and not like an investment. Even though the petitioner's actions were not true hedging (which would include protections against a fall in price), the purchase of the futures were an integral part of its manufacturing business.

Thus, the petitioner was in the business of purchasing corn futures, meaning that IRC § 1221(a)(2)defines petitioner's income as ordinary income, not capital gains.

The Court reasoned that the broad definition of the term "capital asset" does not bring operations of a business. Hedging transactions that are an integral part of a business's inventory-purchase system fall within the inventory exclusion of section 1221.

== Notes ==
=== Corn Products Refining Co. v. Commissioner, 350 U.S. 46 (1955) ===
The Corn Products case involved discussion of whether income arising from the sale of corn futures by a company that refined corn into other forms and food products were entitled to capital gains treatment. The company bought corn futures to protect their future corn supply and pricing and would sell the futures if it had excess inventory corn for its processes. As the corn futures were essentially inventory, they were classified as such property which would “properly be included in the inventory of the taxpayer … in the ordinary course of his trade or business.” IRC § 1221(a)(1).

=== IRC § 1221(a)(7) ===
Since the time of Corn Products, IRC § 1221(a)(7) was added which specifically excludes from the definition of capital asset "any hedging transaction which is clearly identified as such before the close of the day on which it was acquired, originated, or entered into (or other such time as the Secretary may by regulations prescribe)."

This is essentially a codification of the result in Corn Products and removes the necessity of classifying hedging transactions as "inventory" under IRC § 1221(a)(1).

== Importance ==
This case signals that the Court will closely read the exclusions in IRC. § 1221 in classifying capital versus ordinary losses. By sticking with the explicit language of the section the Court clarifies this section for other courts and practitioners interpreting and implementing the Code.

== See also ==
- Arkansas Best Corp. v. Commissioner
- List of United States Supreme Court cases, volume 350
- List of United States Supreme Court cases
- Lists of United States Supreme Court cases by volume
- List of United States Supreme Court cases by the Warren Court
