= Li Fanrong =

Chinese business executive

Li Fanrong (born 1963) is a Chinese business executive who has been the chief executive officer (CEO) of China National Offshore Oil Corporation, a state-owned Chinese oil and gas producer, and a Fortune Global 500 company.

Fanrong was born in Jiangxi province in 1963. He earned a degree in science, majoring in oil production, from Jianghan Petroleum Institute in 1984, and an MBA degree from Cardiff University in 2003.

He has been CEO of China National Offshore Oil since 25 November 2011, when he succeeded Yang Hua. Fanrong has been the chairman of Sinochem and Syngenta since 2022.
