= Ilene S. Gordon =

American business executive (born 1953)

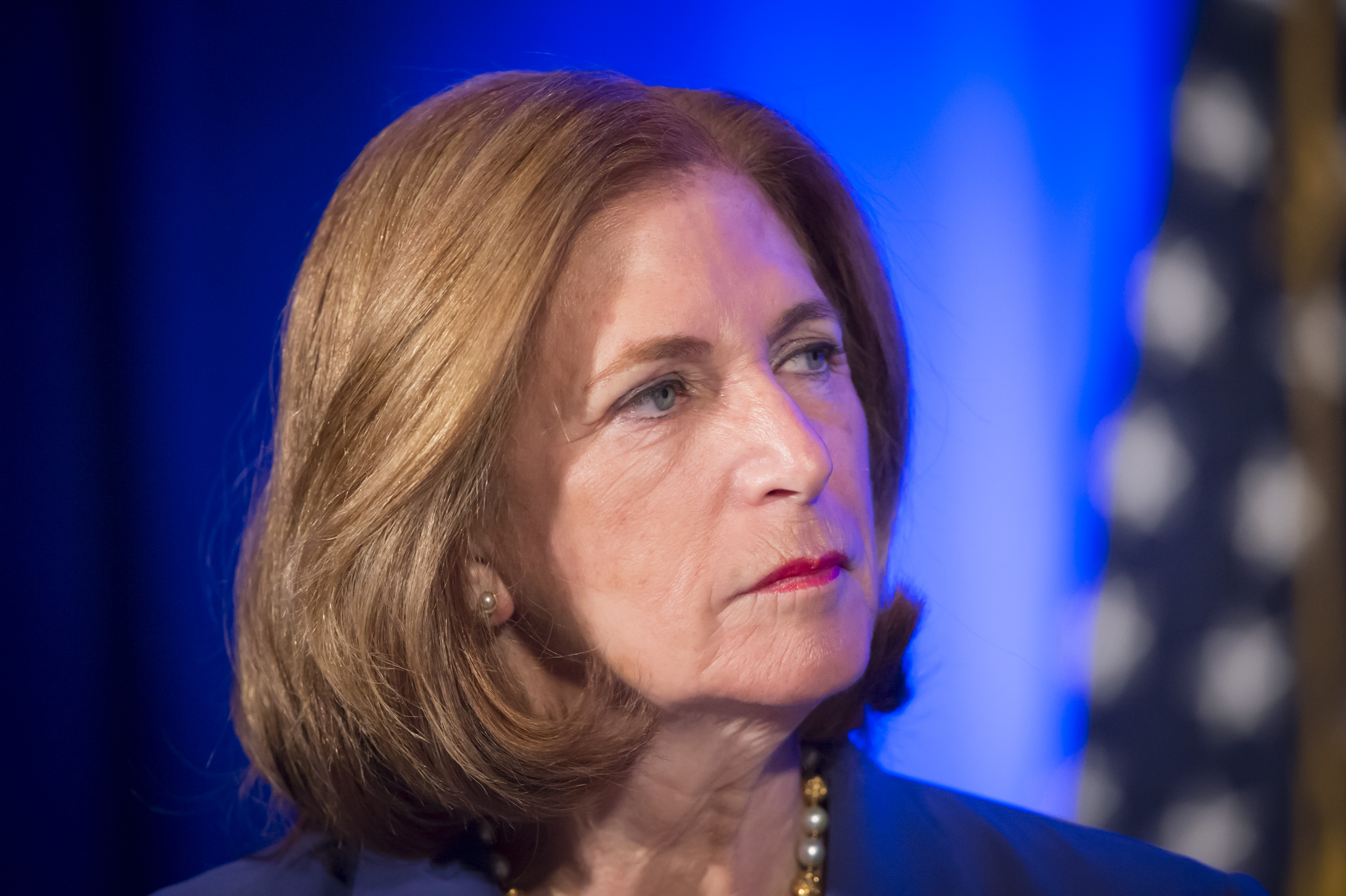
- Born: 1953 (age 72–73)
- Education: Massachusetts Institute of Technology
- Occupation: Businessperson

Ilene S. Gordon (born in 1953) is an American business executive. She became CEO, president, and chairman of Ingredion (formerly Corn Products International) in May, 2009 and became the 21st female CEO of a Fortune 500 company when Ingredion's sales reached $6 billion for the first time, in 2012. As of 2014 she was one of only 24 women who were CEOs of Fortune 500 companies. She retired from the position in 2017.

== Early years and education ==
Gordon earned her Bachelor of Science degree in Mathematics at the Massachusetts Institute of Technology in 1975, graduating Phi Beta Kappa, and a Master of Science degree from the MIT Sloan School of Management in 1976.

When she attended MIT, the male-female ratio of undergraduates was 10:1. Her intention was to become a high school math teacher, but meeting other women at MIT who were preparing to become professionals led her to change her course, pursue a master's degree, and go into business.

== Career ==
After graduating from Sloan School of Management in 1976, Gordon went to work as a consultant for Boston Consulting Group. When the company decided to expand one year later Gordon volunteered to relocate to Europe. She was a strategy consultant based in the Boston, London and Chicago offices, until 1980.

From 1980 until 1982 Gordon worked at Signode, a packaging company specializing in materials handling. In 1982 she joined the Packaging Corporation of America, a division of Tenneco Inc, where she had a mentor who advised her to go into management. As the first female officer of Tenneco, she was the vice president of operations from 1994 to 1997 and the vice president and general manager of the Folding Carton Business from 1997 to 1999. Gordon's worked at Tenneco for 17 years.

In 1999 Gordon joined Pechiney as senior vice president, Pechiney Group and president, Pechiney Plastic Packaging, Inc. Pechiney was acquired by Alcan in 2003 and Gordon held various leadership positions until landing her first role as president and CEO at Alcan Packaging, based in Paris, in 2006, just before the company was acquired by Rio Tinto in July 2007.

Gordon first joined Ingredion Incorporated as the CEO, president and chairman, previously called Corn Products International, on May 4, 2009. Since taking over at Ingredion she re-branded the company and implemented a new corporate strategy, diversifying it from a focus on high fructose corn syrup to making food ingredients more broadly. The company went from a $2.2 billion market cap to over $5 billion with increased sales to $6.5 billion, bringing it onto list of Fortune 500 companies. She retired from her position in 2017.

== Other affiliations ==
In addition to Ingredion, Gordon serves on the board of directors of International Paper and is on the board of trustees of The Conference Board and a member of the MIT Corporation, the institute's board of trustees. She is a director of World Business Chicago (a non-profit economic development organization) and the first female chairman-elect of the Economic Club of Chicago. She is also a member of the board of The Executives' Club of Chicago and The Chicago Council on Global Affairs.

In the past, she has served on the boards of five public companies, and she was the first female director of each: Arthur J. Gallagher & Company, United Stationers Inc., Outboard Marine Corporation, Sunstrand Corporation and Zenith Electronics.

== Awards and recognition ==
Gordon was recognized as one of the 50 most powerful women in business in 2011 in Fortune magazine's ranking, coming in the 42nd position. In 2012 she was ranked 43 in the Fortune list of 50 most powerful women. The National Association of Corporate Directors (NACD) recognized Gordon as the Director of the Year in September 2013.

== Personal life and family ==
Gordon is married and has two children, whom she had when she was in her late twenties.

== See also ==
- List of women CEOs of Fortune 500 companies
