= ArcelorMittal Kryvyi Rih =

Ukrainian steel company

Coordinates: 47.8739°N 33.3972°E

- Native name: АрселорМіттал Кривий Ріг
- Type: Subsidiary
- Industry: Steel
- Founded: 1934; 92 years ago
- Headquarters: Kryvyi Rih, Ukraine
- Key people: Mauro Longobardo (CEO)
- Products: Steel, hot metal, rolled products
- Revenue: 70,634,443,000 hryvnia (2025)
- Total assets: 51,725,655,000 hryvnia (2025)
- Number of employees: over 22,000 (2022)
- Parent: ArcelorMittal
- Website: ukraine.arcelormittal.com

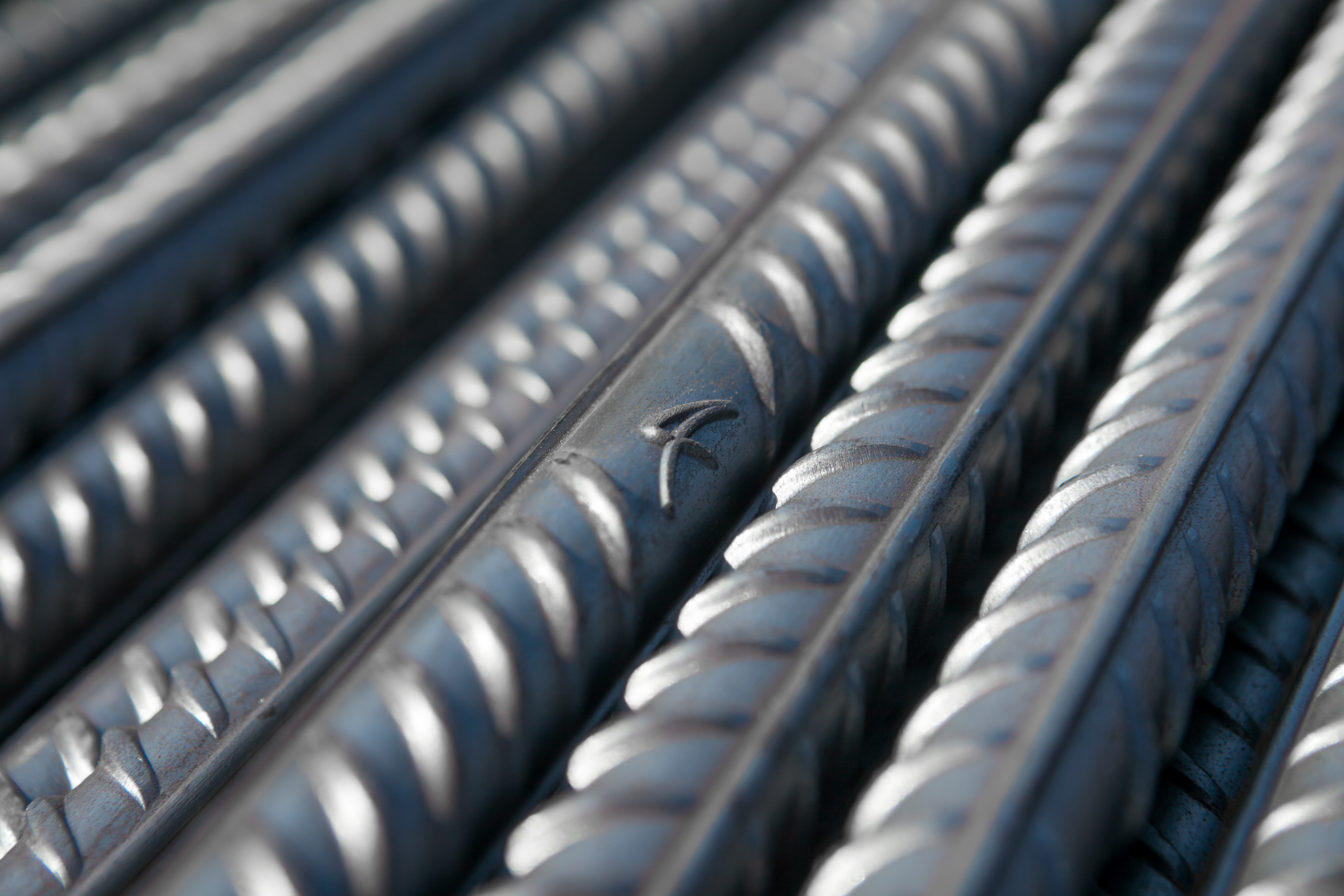
Wire rod production at ArcelorMittal Kryvyi Rih, 2017

ArcelorMittal Kryvyi Rih (Ukrainian: АрселорМіттал Кривий Ріг, Russian: АрселорМиттал Кривой Рог) is a Ukrainian steelworks located in Kryvyi Rih, Dnipropetrovsk Oblast. It was founded in 1931 by the Supreme Soviet of the National Economy under the name of Krivorozhstal, with its first blast furnace operational by 1934. During World War II, the plants equipment was evacuated to Nizhny Tagil, with the remains of the plant being destroyed by Nazi forces during their occupation. Following the war, the plant was reconstructed and expanded, later acquiring the name of the Krivorozhstal Metallurgical Plant named after Vladimir I. Lenin.

Following the dissolution of the Soviet Union and Ukrainian independence, several attempts were made at privatising the plant. In 2005, it was acquired by the Mittal Steel Company led by Indian industrialist Lakshmi Mittal. Following the parent companies acquisition of Arcelor and the formation of ArcelorMittal, the company was renamed ArcelorMittal Kryvyi Rih.

Despite severe challenges as a result of the Russo-Ukrainian war, ArcelorMittal Kryvyi Rih continued operations until September 2026, when work were halted due to significant infrastructure damage. In early October 2026, the plant began the process of halting operations until the prospective end of hostilities.

The presence of iron ore in the regions around Kryvyi Rih has been confirmed since at least 1781 and was rumored to have existed long before by generations of inhabitants. Throughout the 1800s, the region was surveyed for its mineral wealth. Iron ore of 70% iron content and manganese ores were located. In 1881, industrial extraction of iron ore began, alongside other developments such as the construction of the Kryvyi Rih railway. By 1884, over 100,000 tons of iron ore had been extracted, and the railway though Kryvyi Rih, 477 versts (505,6 km) long, from Yasynuvata station via Kryvyi Rih to Dolynska station, had been opened. Iron ore production expanded rapidly during the next few years. By 1896, 20 mines in the Kryvyi Rih Basin were producing over 1,000,000 tonnes of ore. Industrial expansion continued in the region up to 1917. Production dropped during the First World War.

== Foundation and growth in Soviet Union ==
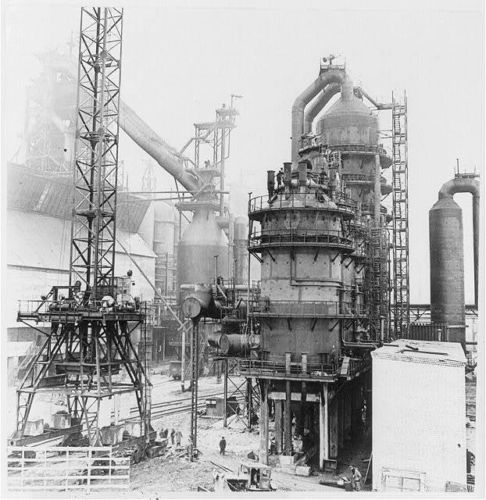
Construction work on a new giant blast furnace iron-melting unit at Lenin Metallurgical Works (Soviet name) in Kryvyi Rih

After the formation of the Soviet Union and expulsion of Austro-Hungarian forces and then anti-communist forces occupying the region under Anton Denikin, relative normalcy resumed. Planning of the plant began in 1929, with the intent to construct an integrated steel plant comprising iron ore and carbon mining to finished steel products. In 1931, the chairman of the Supreme Economic Council of the USSR, Grigori (Sergo) Ordzhonikidze, signed a decree ordering the construction of the facility; that same year, the foundation stone of the metallurgical plant was laid. In August 1934, the first metal was produced at Kryvorizhstal, later known as 'Kryvyi Rih Metallurgical Plant'.

Before the onset of the Second World War, the plant operated with three blast furnaces (of 3,160 m^{3}) and two open hearth furnaces, along with a heat and power plant. In 1941, a blooming mill with a yearly capacity of 1.7 million tonnes, a fourth blast furnace and a third open hearth furnace came online, shortly before the Nazi occupation. Before German troops arrived, equipment and employees were evacuated to Nizhny Tagil, east of the Ural Mountains. During the German occupation from 14 August 1941 to 22 February 1944, what remained of the plant was left in ruins.

After recapturing of the area, the plant was rebuilt and continued its growth. Blast Furnace 7 was built in 1962, and Blast Furnace 8 was completed in 1970, making the plant the largest in Europe. In 1974, Blast Furnace 9 opened, the biggest in the world with a volume of 5,000 m^{3}.

== Ukrainian independence ==
In 1996, restructuring took place, combining the mining and ore concentrating unit Novokrivorozhsky HZK (Новокриворізький ГЗК (НК ГЗК)) (NK-HZK) with the Kryvyi Rih State Mining and Metallurgical Combine (Kryvorizhstal) (Криворізького державного гірничо-металургійного комбінату "Криворіжсталь"). Kryvyi Rih coking plant (Криворізький коксохімічний завод (ККХЗ)) was included in the group in 1997, forming "Novokrivorozhsky mining and processing combine and Kryvyi Rih coking plant" (Новокриворізький гірничо-збагачувальний комбінат і Криворізький коксохімічний завод «Криворіжсталь»), or Kryvoriszhstal. This was all on paper, given that the three units had been always been designed to work jointly, and that the facilities were on the same site.

=== First privatization, 2004 ===
Kryvorizhstal became internationally known when it was privatized in June 2004 for a sum of US$800 million, (₴4.26 billion.) against a government-set reserve price of $714 million, to a consortium called Investment-Metallurgical Union. This consortium included Rinat Akhmetov's SCM and Interpipe Group, controlled by then-President Kuchma's son-in-law Viktor Pinchuk. Higher offers from foreign investors, including a joint bid from Severstal/Arcelor, and a bid from Tata Steel, were rejected on bidding technicalities. The deal was widely criticized by the opposition and from abroad as an example of corruption and state property mismanagement.

On the initiative of newly elected President Viktor Yushchenko, the privatization deal was dismissed by a court in June 2005, and the company sold again in a fair auction.

=== 2005, Second privatisation and ArcelorMittal company ===
At the time of the second privatisation, the company had annual sales of $1897 million with a net profit of $378 million, and cash reserves of $413 million. The plant had a production capacity of ~10 million tonnes of raw steel, and a rolling capacity of under 7 million tonnes, and was able to source most of its requirements for iron ore and coke locally. The bidding process was broadcast live on Ukrainian television, with Arcelor, Mittal Steel Company and Vadim Novinsky's Smart Holdings bidding - Mittal Steel Company was the highest bidder and acquired a 93.02 percent stake in Kryvorizhstal on 24 October 2005, for ₴ 24.2 billion, or US$4.81 billion. Mittal Steel was expected to finance the acquisition from its own cash reserves and from a $3 billion loan arranged with UK based Citigroup. The price exceeded analyst predictions of $3 billion, making it the largest privatization deal in the former Soviet Union.

In 2006, the company was renamed Mittal Steel Kryvyi Rih (Ukrainian : ВАТ «Міттал Стіл Кривий Ріг»), and later in 2007, after the takeover of Arcelor by Mittal steel to form ArcelorMittal, the company was renamed ArcelorMittal Kryvyi Rih.

During the Great Recession, steel production dropped from 8.1 million tonnes in 2007 to 6.2 million in 2008 and 5 million in 2009, with decreases in other production metrics and revenues, with the company registering a net loss of ₴120 million in 2009 (down from a profit of ₴4.7 billion the year before). Production levels recovered to 2008 values in 2010.

== Investments 2006-2024 ==
Between 2006 and 2022 in Ukraine, the company's total investments amounted to $10 billion (including $ 4.8 billion – take over amount during the privatization + $ 5.2 billion - investment in production development). Major investment projects from 2006 to 2022 included:

- Reconstruction of Coke Oven Batteries 3 and 4 ($199 million);
- Category 1 reconstruction of Blast Furnace No. 8 ($127 million);
- Reconstruction of Oxygen Block 2 ($45 million);
- Construction of ladle furnace and Continuous Caster Machine 1 ($112 million);
- Construction of the new packing line at Light Section Mill 2 ($16 million);
- Category 1 reconstruction of Blast Furnace 6 ($117 million);
- Pulverized coal injection built at Blast Furnace 9 ($60 million);
- Reconstruction of Coke Oven Batteries 5 and 6, along with the implementation of environmental measures and an automated environmental monitoring system ($157 million);
- Modernization of Sinter Shop 2 (over $180 million);
- Construction of two new continuous Casting Machines 2 and 3 (over $160 million);
- Reconstruction of Light Section Mill 250-4 (over $60 million);
- Construction of new gas cleaning plants for Basic Oxygen Furnaces 4, 5, and 6 with СО combustion and implementation of automated environmental monitoring system ($65 million);
- From 2008 to 2015, approximately $500 million were invested to replenish old crushers, build new sections at the beneficiation plants (total of three sections), purchase new ball mills, modernize the haulage fleet and in-pit equipment, open a new horizon at the Artem underground mine (1 135 m), and reconstruct the tailing ponds.
- In February 2022 the Russian large-scale invasion of Ukraine caused ArcelorMittal Kryvyi Rih to put it temporarily on hold several major investment projects, including a pellet plant construction initially slated to open in 2023. The company makes an exception only for those projects without which the production might stop completely. Such an example is the construction of a new tailing dump Tretya Karta, which is vital for the continuation of ore mining and safe storage of production waste. The commissioning of the new tailing dump will make it possible to abandon two old similar facilities and reduce the anthropogenic load on the nearby territories. ArcelorMittal company is investing over $150 million in this project.
- As of September 2024, ArcelorMittal Kryvyi Rih plans to continue its operations even with the current challenges of declining iron ore prices and stagnation in the European steel market. Another obstacle is the mobilization campaign in Ukraine, as more than 3,000 employees have joined the Ukrainian Armed Forces, 233 of them were killed or missed.

Mauro Longobardo was appointed chief executive officer of ArcelorMittal Kryvyi Rih, effective 18 February 2020.

== Wartime operations 2022-2026 ==
Due to a shortage of men, AMKR saw a significant increase in the number of women employed in what would traditionally be considered male professions (such as diesel locomotive drivers). As of March 2026, the plant employed more than 4,000 women, occupying 18.8% of management roles. In 2025, 355 women, which made up more than half of all new employees, were hired. As of early 2026, AMKR employed 18,000 people, including 356 veterans. More than 3,500 of its male employers have been mobilised into the Armed Forces of Ukraine.

On 1 January 2026, AMKR ceased the supply of steel to the European Union due to restrictions imposed by the EU Carbon Border Adjustment Mechanism. As a result, a reported 300,000 tons worth of orders were cancelled, more than 3,400 employees were made redundant, and the plants blooming mill, as well as casting and mechanical shops were shut down. GMK Center reported that the company had been operating at a financial loss for five consecutive years, surviving on support from its parent company. In May 2026, the company reported further difficulties in production, due to high electricity and gas prices, as well as a disruption of its rail based logistics from provided by Ukrainian Railways.

== Suspension of operations ==
In 2026, AMKR was targeted in a series of ballistic missile strikes by Russian forces. On 25 September 2026, ArcelorMittal stated that it would be unable to restart production, due to damage to production facilities following the series of Russian ballistic missile strikes. The company reported that over $700 million USD had been provided to sustain the plant, but it expected to record a non-cash impairment charge of approximately $1 billion USD in non-monetary assets due to extensive damage. In 2025, its last full year of operation, AMKR produced 1.69 million tonnes of steel, resulting in the company paying 8.5 billion UAH in taxes and duties.

In October 2026, public broadcaster Suspline reported that the shutdown of AMKR would have a significant impact on the city of Kryvyi Rih, as well as the Ukrainian economy as a whole. It was noted that the plant still directly employs 12-15 thousand staff, in addition to contractors and supporting industries. The Head of the Military Administration of Kryvyi Rih, Oleksandr Vilkul stated that due to a projected fall in tax revenue from AMKR as well as other halted industrial sites including the Ingulets Iron Ore Dressing Works, Southern Mining and Processing Plant and Kryvyi Rih Iron Ore Plant, the city authorities would implement emergency budget cuts and abandon all non-essential expenditure. On 11 October 2026, ArcelorMittal announced that the plant would begin the process of transitioning to a cold shutdown, followed by the mothballing of its remaining assets. It was stated that the plant would not be restarted until the end of hostilities.

In late October 2026, the acting mayor of Kryvyi Rih Yuriy Vilkul, supported by the Kryvyi Rih City Council, published an open letter to Lakshmi Mittal, urging him to reconsider the decision to shut down the plant. The letter states that the city authorities only learned about the suspension of operations from the media, without consultation from the company regarding the drastic socio-economic consequences of the decision. Vilkul emphasised that the shutdown would lead to a significant loss of income for thousands of families and increased social tension in the city and surrounding areas. The letter also highlighted the environmental risks of leaving tailing ponds, dams and drainage systems without repeated maintenance. Vilkul argued that it was technically possible for the plant to remain at least partially in operation, provided the adequate safety measures were taken.

== Production ==
In 2005, the plant produced over 6 MT of crude steel, 5 MT of rolled products and 5.5 MT of hot metal.

Located entirely in Kryvyi Rih, this steel company was built as an integrated mining and steel plant, comprising: an iron ore mine, ore processing factories and two open pits, a coke-processing plant, three sinter shops, steel workshops of different types (two blast furnace shops, blooming facilities) and three metal-rolling workshops.

Production volumes in 2021 were as follows:

- Ore mining: 24.5 million tons
- Concentrate: 11 million tons
- Hot metal: 5.3 million tons
- Steel: 4.9 million tons
- Rolled products: 4.6 million tons

Until the Russian-Ukrainian war, the steel plant was one of the most important Ukrainian companies and was a globally important steel producer. In Ukraine it was the largest steel manufacturer of both rebar and wire rod. ArcelorMittal Kryviy Rih also specialized in the manufacture of sections, angles, strips and billets.

Production had fully and indefinitely stopped by September 2026, following ballistic missiles attacks which destroyed the blast furnaces.

== See also ==
- List of steel producers
