= Martin Trust Center for MIT Entrepreneurship =

The MIT Entrepreneurship Center is one of the largest research and teaching centers at the MIT Sloan School of Management, the business and management school at the Massachusetts Institute of Technology. It was founded in the early 1990s and charged with the mission to develop MIT's entrepreneurial activities and interests in education and research, alliances, and the community.

The E-Center focuses on commercializing technologies that are invented by MIT students. To this end, the E-Center supports 1) the annual MIT $100K Entrepreneurship Competition, and 2) student groups called Innovation Teams. Both groups are designed to support internal MIT students by organizing resources relevant to entrepreneurship.

The Martin Trust Center is responsible for driving entrepreneurial education throughout MIT courses, as well as providing assistance to student entrepreneurs in the form of office resources, space, expert mentorship, and grants and awards.

The center was founded by entrepreneur and Sloan School faculty member Florence Sender and MIT Professor, entrepreneur, and venture capitalist Edward B. Roberts, a co-founder of Meditech, Zero Stage Capital, and Sohu.com among other companies.

The acting managing director of the center is Bill Aulet. The Martin Trust Center is responsible for driving entrepreneurial education throughout MIT courses, as well as providing assistance to student entrepreneurs in the form of office resources, space, expert mentorship, and grants and awards. As of 2025, the Trust Center offers venture studios, accelerators, mentorship, and teaching resources for MIT students and alumni, with updated program descriptions and application windows listed on its official site.

The Martin Trust Center oversees the Patrick J. McGovern, Jr Award that recognizes excellence in entrepreneurship.

== Degree offerings ==
Among other degrees, the Center offers a Master of Business Administration (MBA). In 2006, MIT Sloan launched a new program for entrepreneurs within the MBA degree called Entrepreneurship & Innovation (E&I). In addition to the MBA awarded by the Sloan School, participants are awarded a Certificate in Entrepreneurship and Innovation from MIT.

The E&I option centers on starting and developing enterprises by bringing together students and faculty from across MIT's disciplines to build businesses around ideas and technologies. The program seeks to formalize MIT's long-standing and leading entrepreneurship offerings. E&I students benefit from a specialized weekly seminar for entrepreneurs which features a speaker series and a networking dinner. In addition, a one-week trip to Silicon Valley is coordinated in conjunction with the MIT Sloan MediaTech club.

Program participants apply to the E&I program as part of the MIT Sloan application process. Upon admission to the MBA program, they are then evaluated for admission to the E&I option.

In addition to the core curriculum required for all MBA students, E&I students must take additional entrepreneurship-oriented courses each semester following the first semester core. They must also attend the Silicon Valley Trek and participate in the MIT $100K Entrepreneurship Competition.

The E&I option is led by Professors Ed Roberts, Fiona Murray, and Bill Aulet.

== Awards ==
The Martin Trust Center oversees the Patrick J. McGovern, Jr ’59 Entrepreneurship Award. It is a Massachusetts Institute of Technology award given annually to a MIT student or MIT student team for significant contributions to the study and practice of entrepreneurship at MIT. The award is named after the American businessman and MIT alum, Patrick Joseph McGovern.

== See also ==
- Kenneth Morse, former managing director of the center
