= Bill Aulet =

Author and managing director

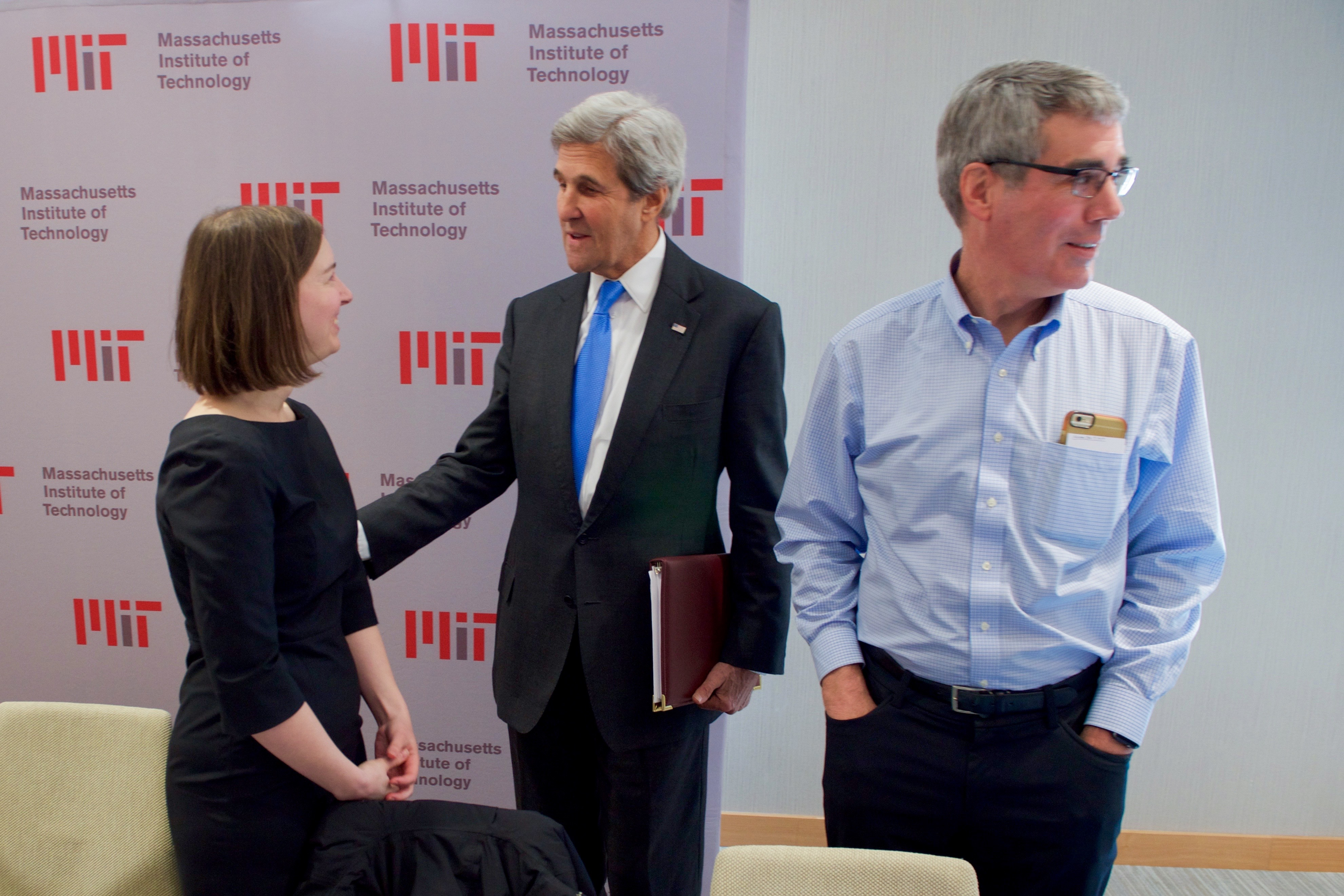
Aulet (right) with Julie Shah and Secretary of State John Kerry.

Bill Aulet is the Managing Director of the Martin Trust Center for MIT Entrepreneurship at MIT and Professor of the Practice at the MIT Sloan School of Management and MIT Sloan Executive Education. He is also the author of Disciplined Entrepreneurship: 24 Steps to a Successful Startup.

== Career ==
Since Aulet became Managing Director in 2009, he has conceived, designed and overseen the implementation of numerous innovative programs, from new courses (Linked Data Ventures, Entrepreneurial Product Marketing and Development, Energy Ventures, Applications of Advanced Entrepreneurial Techniques) and student initiatives (MIT Clean Energy Prize, MIT Entrepreneurship Review) to accelerators (Global Founders’ Skills Accelerator, Beehive Cooperative) and thought leadership initiatives (Regional Entrepreneurship Acceleration Program or REAP). In April 2013, Aulet was awarded the Adolf F. Monosson Prize for Entrepreneurial Mentoring at MIT.

Prior to joining MIT, Aulet worked for more than a decade at IBM before launching a series of startups, including 3-D imaging company SensAble Technologies Inc.

His writings on entrepreneurship have been published by The Wall Street Journal, TechCrunch The Boston Globe, The Huffington Post, Xconomy, the Kauffman Foundation, MIT Sloan Experts, and the MIT Entrepreneurship Review.

== Personal life ==
A former professional basketball player, Aulet lives in Belmont, Massachusetts with his wife; they have four grown sons. One of Aulet's sons is Tom Aulet, founded the company Ergatta, which makes gamified indoor rowers. Aulet holds a bachelor’s in engineering from Harvard University and an SM from the MIT Sloan School of Management.

== Educational activities ==
Bill Aulet teaches the MIT massive open online course (MOOC) on entrepreneurship: "Entrepreneurship 101: Who Is Your Customer?" and is Instructor at MIT Bootcamps.
