= Heather Redman =

American venture capitalist

Heather Redman is an American venture capitalist, attorney, and technology executive based in Seattle, Washington. As the co-founder and managing partner of Flying Fish Partners, she leads a venture capital firm specializing in early-stage investments focused on artificial intelligence and machine learning.

== Early life and education ==
Redman earned a Bachelor of Arts degree in English and Russian from Reed College. She went on to receive her Juris Doctor from Stanford Law School.

== Career ==
=== Legal and Corporate Roles ===
Redman began her career in the early 1990s as an attorney at a Seattle law firm. She subsequently held executive roles at several technology and energy companies, including Vice President of Business Operations and General Counsel at Indix Corporation, Senior Vice President at Summit Power Group, and executive positions at Atom Entertainment, Getty Images, and PhotoDisc.

=== Venture Capital ===
In 2017, Redman co-founded Flying Fish Partners with Geoff Harris and Frank Chang. The firm invests in early-stage startups across the Pacific Northwest, with a particular focus on artificial intelligence and machine learning technologies. Notable investments include companies such as Phaidra and YData.

=== Board Memberships and Civic Engagement ===
Redman serves on the board of directors of PPL Corporation, to which she was appointed in October 2021. She is also a member of the board of directors for the Washington State Investment Board, Coldstream Holdings Inc., the Institute for Systems Biology, and was appointed to the Federal Reserve Bank of San Francisco Board of Directors, Seattle Branch effective January 2026.

== Advocacy for Diversity and Inclusion ==
Redman is an advocate for diversity and inclusion in technology and business leadership. She has supported initiatives to increase the representation of women in leadership and board roles, and co-founded the Puget Sound chapter of Stanford Women on Boards to further this mission.

== Recognition ==
Redman has received numerous honors for her contributions to the business community. She was named to the Puget Sound Business Journal's Power 100 list in 2020, 2021, 2022, 2023, and 2024. She was also recognized as a 2019 Director of the Year by the Puget Sound Business Journal.
