= Arkansas Best Corp. v. Commissioner =

- Supreme Court of the United States

Argued December 9, 1987 Decided March 7, 1988
- Full case name: Arkansas Best Corporation v. Commissioner of Internal Revenue
- Citations: 485 U.S. 212 (more) 108 S. Ct. 971; 99 L. Ed. 2d 183

Case history
- Prior: 83 T.C. 640 (1984); 800 F.2d 215 (8th Cir. 1986); cert. granted, 480 U.S. 930 (1987).

Holding
- Loss arising from sale of stock is capital loss, regardless of taxpayer's motive in purchasing the stock.

Court membership
- Chief Justice William Rehnquist Associate Justices William J. Brennan Jr. · Byron White; Thurgood Marshall · Harry Blackmun; John P. Stevens · Sandra Day O'Connor; Antonin Scalia · Anthony Kennedy

Case opinion
- Majority: Marshall, joined by unanimous
- Kennedy took no part in the consideration or decision of the case.

Laws applied
- Internal Revenue Code § 1221

Arkansas Best Corporation v. Commissioner, 485 U.S. 212 (1988), is a United States Supreme Court decision that helps taxpayers classify whether or not the sale of an asset is an ordinary or capital gain or loss for income tax purposes.

== Facts ==
Arkansas Best, a diversified holding company acquired a large percentage of the stock of the National Bank of Commerce in Dallas, Texas. When the real estate market in Dallas faltered, Arkansas Best sold a large portion of its stake in the Bank at a loss. Arkansas Best claimed a deduction for an ordinary loss of nearly $10 million from the sale. The Commissioner of the Internal Revenue Service disallowed the deduction, finding that it was a capital, not ordinary loss.

== Issue ==
Was the stock properly a capital asset as defined by I.R.C. § 1221? Should the Court read § 1221 broadly as it had in Corn Products Refining Co. v. Commissioner, 350 U.S. 46 (1955)?

== Holding ==
The Eighth Circuit reversed the Tax Court's determination that the loss was an ordinary loss since the Bank stock fell within the general definition of “capital asset” in I.R.C. § 1221 and did not fall within any of the statutory exceptions in the section. A taxpayer's motivation in purchasing an asset is irrelevant to its classification.

== Reasoning ==
- The broad definition of the term “capital asset” explicitly makes irrelevant any consideration of the property's connection with the taxpayer's business. The motive behind the purchase of the asset is not mentioned as a factor in § 1221.
- Congress does not direct the Court to read § 1221 liberally. Congress intended the specific exceptions explicitly contained in § 1221.
- The holding in Corn Products is that hedging transactions that are an integral part of a business’ inventory-purchase system fall within the inventory exclusion of § 1221. This ruling does not apply to the facts of this case.
- The capital stock held by Arkansas Best falls within the broad definition of a “capital asset” in § 1221 and is outside the classes of property excluded from capital-asset status.

== Notes ==
=== Corn Products Refining Co. v. Commissioner, 350 U.S. 46 (1955) ===
The Corn Products case involved discussion of whether income arising from the sale of corn futures by a company that refined corn into other forms and food products were entitled to capital gains treatment. The company bought corn futures to protect their future corn supply and pricing and would sell the futures if it had excess inventory corn for its processes. As the corn futures were essentially inventory, they were classified as such property which would “properly be included in the inventory of the taxpayer … in the ordinary course of his trade or business.” I.R.C. § 1221(a)(1).

=== IRC § 1221(a)(7) ===
Since the time of Corn Products, IRC §1221(a)(7) was added which specifically excludes from the definition of capital asset "any hedging transaction which is clearly identified as such before the close of the day on which it was acquired, originated, or entered into (or other such time as the Secretary may by regulations prescribe)."

This is essentially a codification of the result in Corn Products and removes the necessity of classifying hedging transactions as "inventory" under IRC § 1221(a)(1).

== Importance ==
This case signals that the Court will closely read the exclusions in I.R.C. § 1221 in classifying capital versus ordinary losses. By sticking with the explicit language of the section the Court clarifies this section for other courts and practitioners interpreting and implementing the Code.

== See also ==
- List of United States Supreme Court cases, volume 485
- List of United States Supreme Court cases
- Lists of United States Supreme Court cases by volume
- List of United States Supreme Court cases by the Rehnquist Court
