= Ingredion =

American ingredient manufacturer

Ingredion Inc.
- Formerly: Corn Products Refining Co. (1906–1958); Corn Products Company (1958–1969); CPC International (1969–1997); Corn Products International (1997–2012)
- Type: Public
- Traded as: NYSE: INGR; S&P 400 Component As Corn Products Refining Co., then Corn Products Company, later CPC International, then Corn Products International NYSE: CPC (until 1997, when ticker symbol changed to BF from 1997 as Bestfoods until Unilever (NYSE: UL) acquired in 2000. NYSE: CPI (1997-2012)
- Industry: Food; Beverage; Pharmaceutical; Animal Feed; Corrugating; Paper; Textile; Health & Wellness
- Founded: 1906; 120 years ago (as Corn Products Refining Co.); 1997; 29 years ago (current company by spin-off)
- Headquarters: Westchester, Illinois, United States
- Area served: Worldwide
- Key people: James Zallie (President and CEO); Jim Gray (CFO)
- Products: Sweeteners; Starches; Corn Syrups; Glucose; Oil
- Revenue: ▲US$ 6.894 billion (2021)
- Operating income: ▲US$ 310 million (2021)
- Net income: ▲US$ 125 million (2021)
- Total assets: ▲US$ 6.999 billion (2021)
- Total equity: ▲US$ $3.112 billion (2021)
- Number of employees: 12,000 (2021)
- Website: www.ingredion.com

Ingredion Inc. is an American food and beverage ingredient provider based in Westchester, Illinois, producing mainly starches, non-GMO sweeteners, stevia, and pea protein. The company turns corn, tapioca, potatoes, plant-based stevia, grains, fruits, gums and other vegetables into ingredients for the food, beverage, brewing, and pharmaceutical industries and numerous industrial sectors. As of June 2026, it has about 11,000 employees, and customers in excess of 120 countries.

== History ==
Logo as CPC International (1997)

The company, which began as Corn Products Refining Co. and later as "CPC International," was founded by the merger of leading US corn refiners in 1906. The company was incorporated in New Jersey. The company began producing Argo laundry cornstarch in 1908 and began selling Mazola corn oil in 1911.

In 1919 Corn Products acquired Canada Starch Company (now known as Casco). During the 1920s, the company received a patent for crystalline dextrose, sold as Cerelose, opened refining operations in South America and Mexico, and began selling chocolate-flavored malt syrup Bosco. In the 1930s, Corn Products expanded operations to Asia and further in South America. It also began selling waffle syrup under the Karo name for the first time.

In 1958, Corn Products Refining Company merged with The Best Foods, Inc., becoming Corn Products Company. During the 1960s, the company expanded into Chile, Pakistan and Malaysia, and began producing high-fructose corn syrup at the Argo plant. and in 1969 it changed its name to CPC International Inc.

In the 1970s, CPC expanded into Africa and further into South America, while in 1981 the company constructed three North American plants in Stockton, California; Winston-Salem, North Carolina; and Port Colborne, Ontario.

In 1981, CPC formed a partnership with Texaco to produce bioethanol at a plant in Pekin, Illinois. In 1995, the plant was sold to Williams Companies.

In 1984, Canada Starch Company merged with an Ontario corn refiner to become Casco. In 1987, the company sold its starch factories in Europe for $600 million to the Italian French sugar manufacturer Eridania Béghin-Say owned by Ferruzzi and renamed Cerestar. Cerestar was sold in 2002 to Cargill for $1.14 billion having a turnover of $1.56 billion in 2000.

The Bestfoods division of the company known for brands Maizena, Knorr, Hellmann's / Best Foods mayonnaise and Skippy Peanut Butter existed as a division from 1958 until 1997 when CPC International renamed itself Bestfoods, focusing on packaged food products, and spun-off the corn-refining business into Corn Products International.

In October 2010, CPI acquired National Starch from Dutch paints firm AkzoNobel for $1.3 billion in cash. It also took on pension and employee benefit liabilities.

In 2012, the company was added to the Fortune 500 list and was renamed Ingredion. In 2014, Ingredion opened 14 Idea Labs, a global network of innovation centers where scientists work directly with customers.

In 2015 they acquired Penford Corp for $340 million and then Kerr Concentrates for $100 million. Penford produced mainly potato starch derivatives and had a turn-over of $467 million. In 2014 it had 445 employees in six plants. Kerr Concentrates makes fruit and vegetables concentrates and purees and had a turnover of $75 million and 82 employees. In 2016 the company acquired Shandong Huanong Specialty Corn Development Co, a corn starch manufacturing plant in China. Then in 2017, it acquired TIC Gums as well as Sun Flour Industry Co, a Thai rice starch and flour company. In 2018 Ingredion began a joint venture with Verdient Foods to increase its investment in plant-based proteins and pulse-based flours. (In 2020, Ingredion fully acquired Verdient.) Also in 2018, Ingredion began manufacturing and producing sugar alternative Astraea Allulose in Latin America. In 2019, Ingredion led the series B venture capital raising for The EVERY Company, a company developing an animal(chicken)-free egg white protein based on fermentation. They also acquired Western Polymer, a US potato starch manufacturer that produces cationic starch for the paper industry. Western Polymer employed about 70 people at 3 sites.

Ingredion acquired PureCircle in 2020, a stevia sweeteners maker. That year they also began marketing Canadian company NorQuin's quinoa products. Ingredion also invested $200 million into plant-based meat substitutes. Then in 2021, Ingredion acquired Katech, a German manufacturer of texture and stabilization solutions. The company also began joint ventures with Grupo Arcor, providing food and beverage ingredients to customers in Argentina, Chile and Uruguay, and Amyris, a Brazil-based manufacturer of fermentation-derived Reb M sweetener. Ingredion also opened a new plant protein facility in South Sioux City, Nebraska, becoming the first supplier to manufacture plant protein isolate, concentrate, flour and starch products in North America.

In 2021, Ingredion was ranked second in the Modified Starch category of the Global Food Thickener Companies list and second on the Top 50 Global Sweetener Companies list by FoodTalks.

In 2022, Ingredion acquired a stake in InnovoPro, an Israeli developer of protein concentrate extracted from chickpeas.

In June 2026, it was announced that the company had agreed to acquire Tate & Lyle for $3.6 billion. The deal remains subject to approval by shareholders and regulators.

== Management ==
James Zallie has served as president and CEO since 2018 and as a member of the Board of Directors since 2017. He joined the company in 2010 when it acquired National Starch, where he was President in CEO. Previously with Ingredion, he was the executive vice president of global specialties and president of the Americas region. Zallie replaced Ilene S. Gordon who retired after being President and CEO from 2009 and 2017. The company employs approximately 12,000 people in North America, South America, Europe, the Middle East, Africa, and Asia-Pacific and operates 44 manufacturing facilities in 14 countries.

== Products ==
Ingredion’s products include sweeteners, starches, nutrition ingredients, and biomaterial solutions. Sweetener products include glucose syrup, high maltose syrups, high fructose corn syrup, caramel color, dextrose, polyols, maltodextrins, and glucose and syrup solids. Since its acquisition of PureCircle, Ingredion also produces plant-based stevia sweeteners and flavors for the food and beverage industry. The company’s pea protein isolate is used with protein-fortified products for sports nutrition, bakery, snacks, alternative dairy and alternative meats.

== Recognition ==
The company was named the "World's Most Ethical Company" in 2014 by the Ethisphere Institute. In 2022, Ingredion was named to Fortune's "World's Most Admired Companies" list, ranking 2nd in the Food Production industry category. It was the company’s 13th consecutive year making the list. Also in 2022, Ingredion was included on Bloomberg's "Gender-Equality Index" for the 5th consecutive year, and earned a 95/100 on the Human Rights Campaign's Corporate Equality Index.

== See also ==
- Corn Products Refining Co. v. Commissioner
