= Product intelligence =

System for analyzing product information

Product intelligence is defined as an automated system for gathering and analyzing intelligence about the performance of a product being designed and manufactured, such that this data is automatically fed back to the product managers and engineers designing the product, to assist them in the development of the next iteration or version of that product. The goal of product intelligence is to accelerate the rate of product innovation, thereby making the product and its owners more competitive and increasing customer satisfaction. Product intelligence is often applied to electronic products, but it is not necessarily limited to electronic products.

Key points of this definition:

1. Product intelligence is a separate concept from artificial intelligence.
2. The focus is on the gathering of product performance, quality and test data.
3. There is an automated process for gathering information and converting it into intelligence.
4. The purpose of the exercise is to use the product intelligence to create the next, improved iteration or version of the product.

Product intelligence can also include two additional functions:

1. An automated process for synchronizing all manufacturing locations involved in producing the product, so that production of the new version can begin immediately. This is typically accomplished by pushing product and test specification software to all the test stations in the manufacturing pipeline over a network or web connection. This accelerates the product's time-to-market.
2. The automatic enforcement of quality manufacturing processes to ensure that products are manufactured correctly, according to the precise specifications of the product designers. This ensures quality and consistency across many manufacturing sites.

== See also ==
- Product planning
