= Kenneth Morse =

American business professor

Kenneth P. Morse
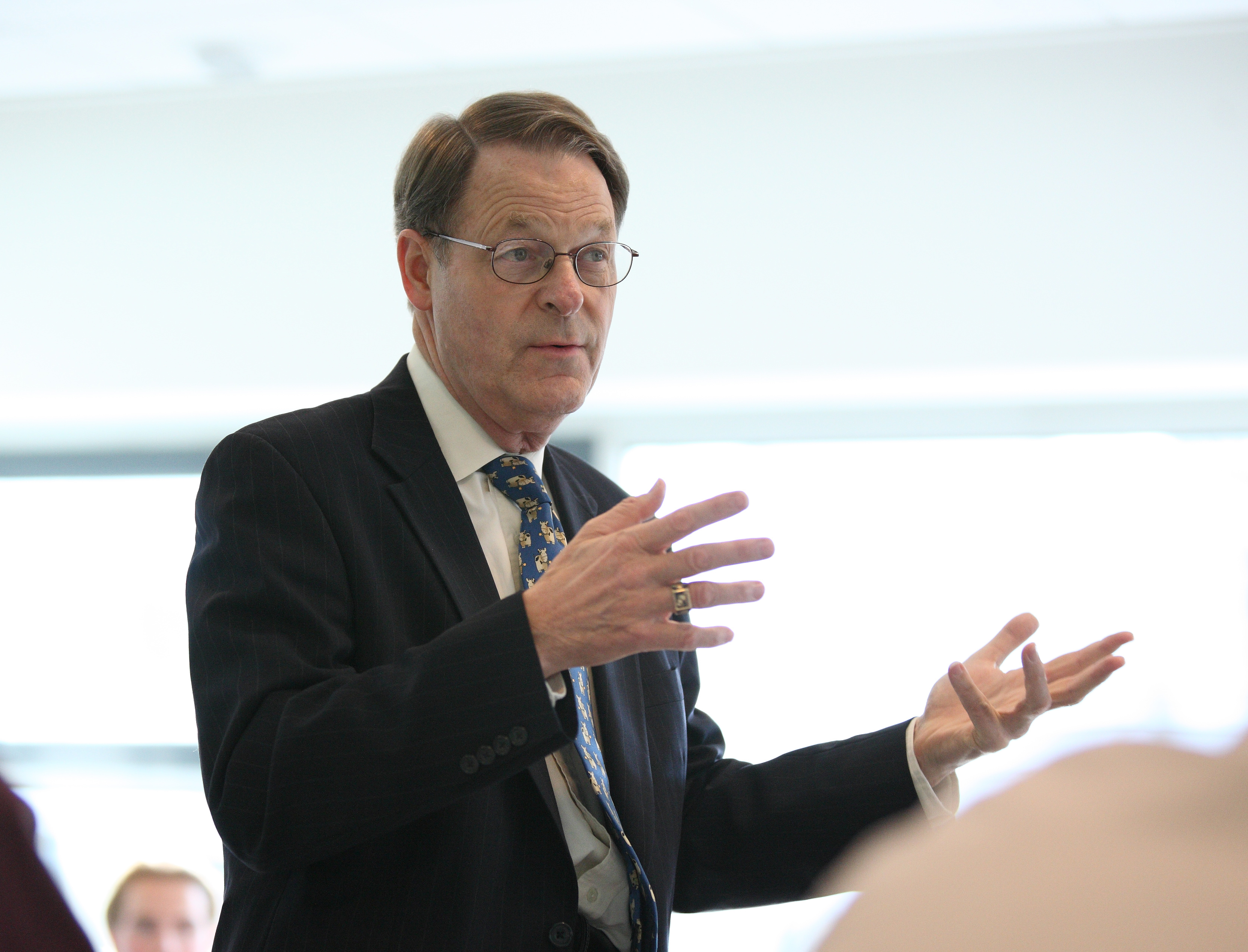
- Born: October 6, 1946 (age 79); Boston, Massachusetts
- Citizenship: United States
- Education: MIT, Harvard Business School
- Occupation: entrepreneur

Kenneth Paul Morse was an early employee at Aspen Technology, Inc., and four other startups. He is the former managing director of the MIT Entrepreneurship Center, and chairman of Entrepreneurship Ventures, Inc. He holds the chair in Entrepreneurship, Innovation, and Competitiveness at Delft University of Technology.

Morse graduated from the Massachusetts Institute of Technology with an S.B. in political science in 1968. He also earned an MBA from Harvard Business School in 1972. Morse is visiting professor at ESADE Business School in Barcelona and holds a chair in Entrepreneurship, Innovation and Competitiveness at Delft University of Technology in Netherlands. His father, Richard S. Morse, taught early entrepreneurship courses at MIT and was also an Assistant Secretary of the Army.
