= List of Massachusetts Institute of Technology alumni =

This list of Massachusetts Institute of Technology alumni includes students who studied as undergraduates or graduate students at MIT's School of Engineering; School of Science; MIT Sloan School of Management; School of Humanities, Arts, and Social Sciences; School of Architecture and Planning; or Whitaker College of Health Sciences. Since there are more than 120,000 alumni (living and deceased), this listing cannot be comprehensive. Instead, this article summarizes some of the more notable MIT alumni, with some indication of the reasons they are notable in the world at large. All MIT degrees are earned through academic achievement, in that MIT has never awarded honorary degrees in any form.

The MIT Alumni Association defines eligibility for membership as follows:

The following persons are Alumni/ae Members of the Association:

All persons who have received a degree from the Institute; and All persons who have been registered as students in a degree-granting program at the Institute for (i) at least one full term in any undergraduate class which has already graduated; or (ii) for at least two full terms as graduate students.

As a celebration of the new MIT building dedicated to nanotechnology laboratories in 2018, a special silicon wafer was designed and fabricated with an image of the Great Dome. This One.MIT image is composed of more than 270,000 individual names, comprising all the students, faculty, and staff at MIT during the years 1861–2018. A special website was set up to document the creation of a large wall display in the building, and to facilitate the location of individual names in the image.

== Politics and public service ==
=== United States ===
Name	Degree	Degree year	Notability	Notes
Lt. Gen. James Alan Abrahamson (USAF Ret'd)	B.S. – Aeronautical Engineering	1955	Director of President Ronald Reagan's Strategic Defense Initiative; US Air Force general	
Jason E. Bartolomei			US Air Force general	
Ben Bernanke	PhD – Economics	1979	Chair of the Federal Reserve Bank	
Samuel Bodman	ScD – Chemical Engineering	1965	Secretary of Energy (2005–2009)	
Jun Choi	B.S. – Aeronautical/Astronautical Engineering	1994	Mayor of Edison, New Jersey	
Henry Cohen	M.S. – Urban Planning	1949	Director of Föhrenwald displaced persons camp in the American sector of post-World War II Germany	
Leighton I. Davis	M.S. – Aeronautical Engineering	1941	US Air Force general	
John M. Deutch	B.S. – Chemical Engineering, PhD – Chemistry	1961 1966	Director of Central Intelligence and US deputy secretary of Defense under President Bill Clinton	
Jimmy Doolittle	M.S., DSc – Aeronautical Engineering	1924 1925	US Air Force general	
T. Coleman du Pont			US senator from Delaware	
Herbert W. Ehrgott	B.S. – Mechanical Engineering	1930	US Air Force general	
Luis A. Ferré	B.S., M.S. – Mechanical Engineering	1924 1925	3rd governor of Puerto Rico	
Julius A. Furer	M.S. – Naval Architecture	1905	US Navy admiral	
J. Michael Gilmore	B.S. – Physics		Director of the Operational Test and Evaluation Directorate	
Jonathan Gruber	B.S. – Economics	1987	Director of the Health Care Program at the National Bureau of Economic Research, professor of economics at MIT	
Kathleen Hicks	Ph.D. – Political science	2010	US deputy secretary of Defense (2021–2025)	
Jenn Hill			Member of the Michigan House of Representatives from the 109th district	
Carl Hosticka	Ph.D. – Political science	1977	Member of the Oregon House of Representatives and the Portland Metro Council	
Chrissy Houlahan	M.S. – Technology and Policy	1994	US representative from Pennsylvania's 6th district	
Marcy Kaptur	PhD – Urban Planning	1981	US representative for Ohio's 9th district	
Frank Kowalski	M.S. – Mechanical Engineering	1937	US representative from Connecticut	
Jon C. Kreitz			US Navy admiral	
John M. Loh	M.S. – Aeronautical Engineering	1973	Retired four-star general in the US Air Force; last served as commander, Air Combat Command; 24th vice chief of staff of the Air Force	
Herbert B. Loper	B.S. – Civil Engineering	1922	US Army general	
N. Gregory Mankiw	PhD – Economics	1984	Chairman of President Bush's Council of Economic Advisors	
William F. Martin	M.S. – "Without Course"	1974	Deputy secretary of Energy (1968–1988), executive secretary of National Security Council, special assistant to President Reagan	
Thomas Massie	B.S. – Electrical Engineering M.S. – Mechanical Engineering	1993 1996	Member of the US House of Representatives from Kentucky's 4th district	
Mark McClellan	PhD – Economics	1993	Head of the Centers for Medicare and Medicaid Services, commissioner of the Food and Drug Administration	
Katharine Dexter McCormick	B.S. – Biology	1904	Suffragette, funded research for the Pill	
Lansing McVickar		1918	Career officer with the United States Army	
Bruce Morrison	B.S. – Chemistry	1965	US representative for Connecticut	
David Nolan	B.S. – Political Science	1965	Founder of United States Libertarian Party	
John Olver	PhD – Chemistry	1961	US representative for Massachusetts	
John Birdsell Oren	M.S. – Marine Engineering		US Coast Guard admiral	
Alex Padilla	B.S. – Mechanical Engineering	1994	US senator from California, appointed by Governor Gavin Newsom after Kamala Harris was elected vice president	
Luz Maria Rivas	B.S. – Electrical Engineering	1995	US representative for California's 29th District	
Joseph J. Romm	SB – Physics PhD – Physics	1982 1987	Assistant secretary of the US Department of Energy	
Francis Sargent	Dropped out; studied architecture	[1939]	64th governor of Massachusetts	
George Shultz	PhD – Economics	1949	Secretary of the Treasury and secretary of state	
Phillips Waller Smith	M.S. – Ordnance Engineering	1935	US Air Force general	
Paul Sohl	B.S. – Aeronautical Engineering	1985	US Navy admiral	
Pete Stark	B.S. – General Engineering	1956	US representative for California	
Lawrence Summers	B.S. – Economics	1975	71st US secretary of the Treasury	
Chris Sununu	B.S. – Civil/Environmental Engineering	1998	82nd governor of New Hampshire	
John E. Sununu	B.S., M.S. – Mechanical Engineering	1987 1987	United States senator from New Hampshire	
John H. Sununu	B.S., M.S., PhD – Mechanical Engineering	1961 1963 1966	White House chief of staff under President George H. W. Bush, governor of New Hampshire, host of Crossfire	
Sheila Widnall	B.S., M.S., DSc – Aeronautical/Astronautical Engineering	1961 1961 1964	US secretary of the Air Force (1993–1997)	
Tom Wolf	PhD – Political Science	1981	47th governor of Pennsylvania	
Louise Yeung	MS - City Planning	2013	Chief Climate Officer of New York City	

=== International ===
Name	Degree	Year	Notability	Notes
Tadatoshi Akiba	PhD – Mathematics	1970	Mayor of Hiroshima; recipient of Ramon Magsaysay Award	
Kofi Annan	M.S. – Management	1972	Ghanaian former secretary-general of the United Nations	
Moshe Arens	B.Sc. – Aeronautical ngineering		Israel minister of Defense three times, minister of Foreign Affairs	
Pedro Aspe	PhD – Economics	1978	Mexican secretary of Finance and Public Credit	
Virgilio Barco	B.S. – Civil Engineering	1943	Colombian president	
Selçuk Bayraktar	MAE – Aerospace Engineering	2006	Turkish chairman of the board and chief technology officer, Baykar	
Youssef Boutros Ghali	PhD – Economics	1981	Former Egyptian minister of Finance	
Ahmed Chalabi	B.S. – Mathematics	1965	Controversial Iraqi politician; deputy prime minister of Iraq; convicted of fraud	
Asim Dasgupta	PhD – Economics	1975	Former finance minister of the Indian state of West Bengal	
Harold Demuren	PhD – Aeronautical Engineering	1975	Director general of the Nigerian Civil Aviation Authority; first African elected as president of ICAO General Assembly	
Mario Draghi	PhD – Economics	1977	Former president of the European Central Bank; former prime minister of Italy	
José Figueres Ferrer		1926	Former (three-time) president of Costa Rica	
Pervez Hoodbhoy	SB, Electrical Engineering, Mathematics, M.S. – Solid-State Physics, PhD – Nuclear Physics	1973 1978	Faculty member at the Quaid-e-Azam University since 1973; renowned nuclear research scientist in Pakistan	
C.D. Howe		1907	American-born Canadian politician and cabinet minister	
Janet Keeping	B.S. – Architecture	1971	Lawyer; faculty member at the University of Calgary; leader of the Green Party of Alberta	
Uzi Landau	PhD – Engineering	1976	National Infrastructure minister of Israel	
Pita Limjaroenrat	MBA – Strategy	2011	Thai politician and leader of Move Forward Party	
Mao Chi-kuo	PhD – Civil Engineering	1982	Former premier of the Republic of China (Taiwan) (2014–2016)	
David Miliband	M.S. – Political Science	1990	British politician, secretary of state for Foreign and Commonwealth Affairs	
Yahya Muhaimin	Ph.D.	1982	Former minister of Education and Culture, Republic of Indonesia	
Mohammad Ali Najafi	M.S. – Mathematics	1979	Former vice president of Iran and Mayor of Tehran; murderer	
Benjamin Netanyahu	B.S. – Architecture, M.S. – Management	1975, 1976	Prime minister of Israel	
Ngozi Okonjo-Iweala	MCP – City Planning, PhD – Regional Economics and Development	1978 1981	Director-general of the World Trade Organization, finance minister of Nigeria (2003–2006; 2011–2015) and foreign minister of Nigeria (2006)	
Lucas Papademos	B.S. – Physics, M.S. – Electrical Engineering, PhD – Economics	1970 1972 1978	Vice president of the European Central Bank (2002–2010) and prime minister of Greece (2011–2012)	
Rachid Mohamed Rachid	PhD – Management	1993	Former Egyptian minister of Trade and Industry	
Raghuram Rajan	PhD – Economics	1991	23rd governor of Reserve Bank of India	
Omar Razzaz	M.A. – City Planning	Unknown	Prime minister of Jordan	
Ali Akbar Salehi	PhD – Nuclear Engineering	1977	Minister of Foreign Affairs of Iran (2011–13)	
Sumana Shrestha	MBA	2011	Minister of Education, Science and Technology, Federal Democratic Republic of Nepal	
Aafia Siddiqui	BS – Biology		Pakistani, termed "Lady al-Qaeda", serving an 86-year sentence at the Federal Medical Center, Carswell for attempted murder and other felonies	
Chadchart Sittipunt	M.S. – Structural Engineering		Current governor of Bangkok	
Palanivel Thiagarajan	MBA – Financial Management	1990	Finance minister of Indian State of Tamil Nadu	
Milen Velchev	M.S. – Management	1995	Bulgarian financial minister (2001–2005)	
Luis Videgaray	PhD – Economics	1998	Mexican secretary of Foreign Affairs (2017–2018); secretary of Finance and Public Credit (2012–2016)	
David Walter	M.S. – Political Science	circa 1970	British BBC and ITN correspondent and later political advisor	
Robert Winters			Canadian politician	
Tony Tan Keng Yam	M.S. – Operations Research	1964	President of the Republic of Singapore; held various cabinet positions	

== Architecture and design ==
- Christopher Charles Benninger (MCP 1971) – award-winning architect and urban planner in India, Sri Lanka, prepared capital plan of Bhutan
- Walter Danforth Bliss – architect from California, with many buildings on the National Register of Historic Places
- George Burnap (SB, 1906) – landscape architect of Meridian Hill Park and the first White House Rose Garden in Washington, D.C.
- Gordon Bunshaft (BArch 1933, MArch 1935) – architect of Lever House (New York City), Beinecke Library (Yale), Hirshhorn Museum and Sculpture Garden (Washington DC); Pritzker Prize (1988)
- Vishaan Chakrabarti (MCP 1993) – architect and dean of UC Berkeley's College of Environmental Design
- Ogden Codman, Jr. (1884) – Beaux-Arts domestic architect, interior designer
- Walter S. Davis (BArch 1910, MArch 1911) – designed numerous buildings in Los Angeles, California
- John Desmond (MArch) – designed numerous public buildings in Baton Rouge, including the River Center
- Daniel Chester French (1871, one year) – sculptor of Abraham Lincoln (Lincoln Memorial), John Harvard (Harvard Yard), Minute Man (Concord, Massachusetts)
- Cass Gilbert (1880) – architect of the US Supreme Court Building, Woolworth Building (New York City)
- Greta Gray (1880–1961) – Bachelor of Architecture, home economist at UCLA, author and academic
- Charles Sumner Greene (1891) – partner in Greene and Greene, domestic architects of Arts & Crafts style, Gamble House (Pasadena)
- Henry Mather Greene (1891) – partner in Greene and Greene, domestic architects of Arts & Crafts style, Gamble House (Pasadena)
- Marion Mahony Griffin (1894) – co-designer of the master plan for Canberra, Australia
- Nathanael Herreshoff (B.S. 1870) – naval architect-engineer, yacht designer
- Raymond Hood (1903) – architect of Rockefeller Center (New York City), Tribune Tower (Chicago)
- Lois Lilley Howe (B.S. 1890) – second woman in the US to found an architecture firm
- Jarvis Hunt – Chicago architect
- Myron Hunt (B.S. 1893) – architect of Huntington Art Gallery, Rose Bowl (Pasadena)
- Piotr Kowalski (B.S. 1952) – artist, sculptor, architect, professor
- Roger K. Lewis (BArch 1964; MArch 1967) – architect, urban planner, professor, author
- Austin W. Lord (1888) – architect of the administration buildings, Isthmian Canal Commission, Panama; director of the School of Architecture at Columbia University
- Samuel Lunden (M.A. 1921) – architect
- Kevin A. Lynch (B.S. 1947) – urban planner, author of the seminal book The Image of the City
- John O. Merrill (B.S. 1921) – structural engineer, architect, leader of Skidmore, Owings and Merrill
- Eleanor Manning O'Connor (B.S. 1906) – architect, educator, public housing advocate
- Neri Oxman (1976– ) – Ph.D. Architectural Design (2010)
- I. M. Pei (BArch 1940) – architect, Louvre Pyramid (Paris), Rock and Roll Hall of Fame (Cleveland), Bank of China (Hong Kong), MIT Buildings 18, 54, 66, E15; AIA Gold Medal (1979), Pritzker Prize (1983)
- Frank M. Riley (1900) – architect
- Donald W. Southgate (1887–1953) – architect in Nashville, Tennessee
- Sumner Spaulding (1892–1952) – architect, graduated in 1916, designed many buildings in California
- Louis Sullivan (one year) – influential founder of the Chicago School; "father of skyscrapers"; "father of modernism"; AIA Gold Medal (1944)
- James Knox Taylor (1880) – supervisory architect of Denver Mint, Philadelphia Mint, many post offices, court houses, other federal buildings
- Robert Taylor (1892) – MIT's first black graduate, architect of the Tuskegee Institute
- Harry Mohr Weese (BArch 1938) – architect, historic preservation advocate, designed first group of stations for Washington Metro system

== Business and entrepreneurship ==
See also List of companies founded by Massachusetts Institute of Technology alumni

=== Computers and Internet ===
- Joseph Alsop (B.S. 1967) – co-founder of Progress Software
- Efi Arazi – Israeli industrialist and businessman, founder of Scitex Corporation
- Shiva Ayyadurai (B.S. 1987, M.S. 1989, M.S. 1990, PhD 2007) – scientist and inventor
- Sanju Bansal – co-founder of MicroStrategy
- Hugo Barra – VP Global for Xiaomi, former VP and product spokesman for Google Android
- Anant Bhardwaj (Ph.D. dropout) – founder of Instabase
- Katie Bouman (PhD 2017) – developer of the algorithm used in filtering the first images of a black hole taken by the Event Horizon Telescope
- Patrick Collison (dropped out) – co-founder and CEO of Stripe
- Larry DeMar (B.S. 1979) – programmer for Williams, co-creator of Defender and Robotron: 2084, and founder of Leading Edge Design
- John J. Donovan (Postdoc 1969) – founder of Cambridge Technology Partners, and Open Environment Corporation
- Eran Egozy – co-founder, CTO, and VP of Harmonix Systems; now clarinetist and professor of music at MIT
- Liam Fedus (B.S. 2010) – machine learning researcher and entrepreneur, co-founder of Periodic Labs
- Arash Ferdowsi (dropped out) – co-founder and CTO at Dropbox
- Carly Fiorina (M.S. 1989) – former CEO of Hewlett-Packard
- Philip Gale (1978–1998) – writer of TotalAccess, computer prodigy, and Internet software developer
- Gideon Gartner (B.S. 1956) – founder of Gartner
- Andy Gavin – co-founder of Naughty Dog and creator of the first video game with a full 3D environment, Crash Bandicoot
- Shuman Ghosemajumder – author of Open Music Model, click fraud czar at Google
- Cecil H. Green (B.S. 1924, M.S. 1924) – co-founder of Texas Instruments
- Philip Greenspun (B.S. 1982, M.S. 1993, PhD 1999) – entrepreneur, professor, writer, pilot
- Andrew He (B.S. 2019) – competitive programmer
- William R. Hewlett (M.S. 1936) – co-founder of Hewlett-Packard
- Danny Hillis (B.S. 1978, M.S. 1981, PhD 1988) – co-founder of Thinking Machines and former Disney Fellow
- Mark Horowitz (B.S. 1978, M.S. 1978) – founder of Rambus
- Drew Houston (B.S. 2006) – co-founder and CEO of Dropbox
- Irwin M. Jacobs (M.S. 1957, ScD 1959) – co-founder of Qualcomm with Andrew Viterbi, current chairman and former CEO; former MIT professor (1959–1966)
- Brewster Kahle (B.S. 1982) – internet archivist, founder of Alexa
- Mitch Kapor – software entrepreneur, founder of Lotus Corporation
- Steve Kirsch (B.S. 1980, M.S. 1980) – inventor of the optical mouse, co-founder of Frame Technology Corporation and founder of Infoseek Corporation
- Alan Kotok (B.S. 1962, M.S. 1962) – chief architect PDP-10, associate chairman World Wide Web Consortium
- Susan Landau (PhD 1983) – Guggenheim Fellow and cybersecurity expert
- Daniel Lewin (M.S. 1998) – founder of Akamai
- Jack Little (B.S. 1978) – co-founder of MathWorks, which created and sells MATLAB
- Steve Mann – co-creator of the SixthSense device
- Patrick McGovern (B.S. 1960) – founder of IDG/Computerworld
- Steve Meretzky (B.S. 1979) – computer game designer
- Robert Metcalfe (B.S. 1969) – entrepreneur, founder of 3Com; inventor of Ethernet
- Pranav Mistry (PhD) – co-creator of the SixthSense device
- Nicholas Negroponte (B.Arch, M.Arch 1966) – founder, MIT Media Lab, One Laptop per Child Association
- Andrew Ng (M.S. 1998) – co-founder of education technology company Coursera, director of Stanford University's Artificial Intelligence Lab
- Robert Noyce (PhD 1953) – integrated circuit pioneer, co-founder of Intel, Draper Prize (1969)
- Ken Olsen (B.S. 1950, M.S. 1952) – founder of Digital Equipment Corporation
- Suhas Patil (M.S. 1967, PhD 1970) – founder of Cirrus Logic
- William Poduska (B.S. 1960, M.S. 1960, ScD 1962) – computer engineer and entrepreneur, founder of Prime Computer and Apollo Computer
- William A. Porter (MBA 1967) – founder of E*TRADE
- Kanjun Qiu (M.S 2013) – founder of Imbue, an AI research lab
- Allen Razdow (B.S. 1976) – founder of Mathsoft Inc.; inventor of Mathcad
- Alex Rigopulos (B.S. 1994, M.S. 1994) – founder of Harmonix Music Systems, developer of Guitar Hero and Rock Band
- Larry Roberts (B.S. 1961, M.S. 1961, PhD 1963) – member of design group for original ARPANET, co-founder of Caspian Networks and Packetcom, former CEO of DHL
- Sheldon Roberts (M.S. 1949, ScD 1952) – one of the "traitorous eight" who founded Fairchild Semiconductor; co-founder of Amelco which later became Teledyne
- Douglas T. Ross (M.S. 1954) – founder of SofTech, Inc.
- Michael J. Saylor (B.S. Astronautics 1987, B.S. Science, Engineering, Technology 1987) – co-founder of MicroStrategy
- Megan Smith (B.S. 1986, M.S. 1988) – Google executive; former CEO of PlanetOut, early smartphones at General Magic, 3rd United States Chief Technology Officer (2014–17)
- Robert Spinrad (PhD) – computer pioneer; director of the Xerox Palo Alto Research Center
- Ray Stata (B.S. 1958, M.S. 1958) – founder of Analog Devices
- Lisa Su (B.S. 1990, M.S. 1991, PhD 1994) – CEO of Advanced Micro Devices
- Eric Swanson – co-founder of Sycamore Networks
- Theodore Tso – Google software engineer, maintainer of the ext4 filesystem
- Philippe Villers (M.S. 1960) – founder of Computervision, which is now part of PTC
- Andrew Viterbi (B.S. 1957, M.S. 1957) – electrical engineer; inventor of the Viterbi algorithm; co-founder of Qualcomm; former UCLA and UCSD professor
- Brandon Wade (B.S. 1993) – founder of Seeking Arrangement
- Christopher Weaver (M.S. 1985) – founder of Bethesda Softworks and co-founder of ZeniMax Media
- Charles Zhang (PhD 1993) – chairman of the board and CEO of Sohu, Inc.
- Sam Bankman-Fried - Founder and former CEO of the cryptocurrency exchange FTX, sentenced to 25 years in federal prison in March 2024 for a multi-billion dollar fraud scheme.

=== Engineering ===
- Satya N. Atluri (Sc.D Aeronautics & Astronautics, 1969) – engineer; recipient of 2013 Padma Bhushan 2013, 2015 Crichlow Trust Prize from AIAA
- Colin Angle – co-founder of iRobot
- Vanu Bose (B.S. 1988, M.S. 1994, PhD. 1999) – electrical engineer, founder of Vanu Inc, and son of Amar Bose
- Karel Bossart (M.S. 1927) – designer of the SM-65 Atlas missile
- Nick Caldwell (BSc 2003) – Silicon Valley executive and advocate for tech leaders of color
- William David Coolidge (B.S. 1896) – physicist who made major contributions to X-ray machines, director of the General Electric Research Laboratory
- Henry M. Crane (B.S. 1895 and 1896) – automotive engineer associated with Crane Motor Car Company, Crane-Simplex, Pontiac Six, and Wright-Martin
- Charles Stark Draper (B.S. 1926, M.S. 1928, SD 1938) – engineer and inventor; the "father of inertial navigation"; inducted into the National Inventors Hall of Fame in 1981
- Tiera Guinn Fletcher – aerospace engineer
- Eric Gilbertson B.S. (2008), M.S. (2010), and Ph.D. (2014), teaching professor of engineering at Seattle University, mountaineer
- Gordon T. Gould (M.S., 1950), US Air Force lieutenant general
- Crawford Greenewalt (B.S. 1922) – chemical engineer, president of DuPont, lead DuPont engineer on the Manhattan Project plutonium breeder reactors, ornithologist and photographer
- Helen Greiner – co-founder of iRobot
- Sir Kenelm Guinness, 4th Baronet (B.S.) – engineer with the International Bank for Reconstruction and Development
- Alexander Healy (sheepman) (B.S. 1903)
- Alice M. Hoffman (B.S. 1982; M.S. 1983) – project manager of Ravens Stadium and Soldier Field renovation
- J. Halcombe Laning (B.S. 1940, PhD 1947) – developer of Q-guidance system and Apollo mission guidance system
- Charles Townsend Ludington – aviation pioneer
- Ernest Boyd MacNaughton (B.S. 1902) – bank president; president of The Oregonian; president of Reed College
- Fred Mannering (PhD 1983) – professor University of South Florida; Clarivate Highly Cited Researcher, member of the US National Academy of Engineering
- Jim Marggraff (B.S. Electrical Engineering, M.S. Computer Science) – inventor of the LeapPad Learning System, Fly pentop computer, and Livescribe smartpen
- Lissa Martinez (M.S. 1980) – ocean engineer
- Regina Murphy (SB 1978, PhD 1989) – professor of chemical engineering at the University of Wisconsin-Madison
- Mohammad Modarres – eminent professor of the University of Maryland; founder of world's first graduate curriculum in reliability engineering
- Ravi Pandit – co-founder of KPIT Technologies
- Henry M. Paynter (B.S. civil engineering 1944, M.S. mathematics and science 1949, ScD hydroelectric engineering 1951, all MIT) – inventor of bond graphs
- Nicholas A. Peppas – professor of engineering, University of Texas at Austin, pioneer in drug delivery, biomaterials, hydrogels and nanobiotechnology
- Thuan Pham (B.S. Computer Science & Engineering 1990, M.S. 1991) – CTO of Uber
- Mabel MacFerran Rockwell (SB 1925) – only woman involved in designing and installing the power generating machinery for Hoover Dam
- RJ Scaringe (M.S., PhD) – CEO of Rivian Automotive
- Tom Scholz – founder of the rock group Boston and Scholz Research & Development, Inc., manufacturers of Rockman sound equipment
- Dorian Shainin (B.S. 1936) – quality paradigm pioneer and guru; considered one of the world's foremost experts in the fields of industrial problem solving, product reliability and quality engineering; known for the creation and development of the "Red X" concept
- Mareena Robinson Snowden – first Black woman to earn a Ph.D. in nuclear engineering
- Suhas Pandurang Sukhatme – former chairman of Atomic Energy Regulatory Board of India
- Suchatvee Suwansawat (M.S. Policy and Technology, Sc.D Geotechnical Engineering 2002) – Thai politician, professor of Engineering, former president of King Mongkut's Institute of Technology Ladkrabang (KMITL), former president of the Thai Council of Engineers
- Christine Taylor-Butler (civil engineering 1981) – children's author

=== Manufacturing and defense ===
- Vaughn Beals – CEO of Harley-Davidson
- Amar Bose – founder and chairman of Bose Corporation
- Wesley G. Bush – chairman, CEO and President of Northrop Grumman
- Morris Chang – chairman of the Taiwan Semiconductor Manufacturing Company (TSMC), the largest semiconductor foundry in the world
- Nick DeWolf – co-founder of Teradyne
- John Dorrance – founder of Campbell's
- Donald Douglas – founder of Douglas Aircraft Company
- Pierre S. du Pont – Du Pont Company and General Motors executive
- T. Coleman du Pont – Du Pont Company president; US Senator
- Armand V. Feigenbaum – quality expert
- William Clay Ford, Jr. – chairman of Ford Motor Company
- Bernardo Garza Sada – founder and president of the ALFA conglomerate of Mexico
- Kenneth Germeshausen – co-founder, and the first "G", of the defense contractor EG&G
- Bernard Marshall Gordon (B.S. 1949, M.S. 1949) – electrical engineer, inventor, philanthropist, co-founded Analogic Corporation, National Medal of Technology (1986)
- George Hatsopoulos – founder of Thermo Electron Corporation
- Charles Koch – co-owner, chairman and CEO of Koch Industries, the second largest private company in the US
- David H. Koch – co-owner of Koch Industries; Vice-Presidential candidate for the Libertarian Party
- Jay Last – one of the "traitorous eight" who founded Fairchild Semiconductor; co-founder of Amelco, which became Teledyne
- James McDonnell – co-founder of McDonnell Douglas
- Alan Mulally – president and CEO of Ford Motor Company
- William Emery Nickerson – co-founder of Gillette, now part of Procter & Gamble
- Willard Rockwell – founder of Rockwell International
- Henry Singleton – founder of Teledyne
- Alfred P. Sloan, Jr. – automobile entrepreneur, former CEO of General Motors
- Wong Tsu – first engineer of the Boeing Company
- Uncas Whitaker – founder of AMP Incorporated (now a division of Tyco International)
- Rick Woodward – president of Woodward Iron Company, owner of Birmingham Barons

=== Finance and consulting ===
- Roger Ward Babson – entrepreneur, founder of Babson Institute (now Babson College), 1940 presidential nominee on the Prohibition Party ticket
- Sam Bankman-Fried (B.S. 2014) – convicted fraudster and former CEO of the insolvent cryptocurrency exchange FTX and quantitative cryptocurrency trading firm Alameda Research
- Michael Brennan – pioneering finance academic, former president of the American Finance Association
- Richard Carrión – CEO of Banco Popular de Puerto Rico, and of Popular, Inc.
- Wesley Chan – investment partner at Google Ventures
- Lisa Endlich – business author, former vice president of Goldman Sachs
- Mark Gorenberg – partner of the venture capital firm Hummer Winblad Venture Partners
- Michael Hammer – pioneer of Business Process Reengineering, founder of Hammer and Co.
- Robert C. Hancké – Belgian economist
- Mansoor Ijaz – founder and chairman of Crescent Investment Management Ltd; developer of the CARAT trading system
- Shantanurao Laxmanrao Kirloskar – founder of Kirloskar Group
- Arthur Dehon Little – entrepreneur, founder of the eponymous management consulting firm Arthur D. Little in 1886
- Mark Mobius – emerging markets investor and fund manager
- Kenichi Ohmae – former director of the Japan arm of McKinsey & Company, management consultants
- Tom Perkins – founder of venture capital firm Kleiner, Perkins, Caufield & Byers
- John S. Reed – chairman of the New York Stock Exchange
- Ed Seykota – commodity trader
- Jim Simons – mathematician; philanthropist; founder of Renaissance Technologies hedge fund
- John Thain – former CEO of Merrill Lynch, former chief executive officer of the New York Stock Exchange
- William Toy – director at CDC, New York and Goldman Sachs; developer of the Black–Derman–Toy interest rate model
- C. S. Venkatakrishnan – CEO of Barclays
- Gary Wang – former CTO at bankrupt cryptocurrency exchange FTX
- Nigel Wilson – CEO of Legal & General

=== Healthcare and biotechnology ===
- Thomas O. Bales Jr. (BS Mechanical engineering) – medical technology inventor and entrepreneur
- Bertha Isabelle Barker – bacteriologist at Rockefeller Institute for Medical Research, studied tuberculosis
- David Benaron – digital health entrepreneur, physician
- Regina E. Herzlinger (B.S. economics) – first woman to be tenured and chaired at HBS and to serve on large corporate health care boards of directors, including John Deere and Cardinal Health; author of three best-selling health care trade books; known as the "godmother of consumer-driven health care"
- Paul F. Levy (SB, MCP 1974) – former president of Beth Israel Deaconess Medical Center hospitals, former executive director of Boston's MWRA Harbor Cleanup project
- Neil Pappalardo (SB physics, electrical engineering 1964) – founder and chairman of MEDITECH
- Bernard Sherman (PhD astrophysics) – Canadian billionaire, philanthropist, and founder of Apotex
- Robert A. Swanson – co-founder of Genentech
- Ron Williams – former chairman, president and CEO of Aetna

=== Miscellaneous ===
- David A. Aaker – consultant and author of Marketing
- Aditya Birla – industrialist, deceased son of Basant Kumar Birla; head of Aditya Birla Group
- Joseph Chung – co-founder of Art Technology Group with fellow MIT grad Jeet Singh
- Samuel Face – inventor and co-developer of advances in concrete and piezoelectric technologies
- Victor Kwok-king Fung – prominent Hong Kong billionaire businessman and political figure
- Antonio Galloni – wine critic and founder of Vinous
- Eugenio Garza Sada – Mexican businessman, philanthropist and founder of the Tec de Monterrey
- Krisztina "Z" Holly (B.S. 1989, M.S. 1992) – co-founder of Stylus Innovation, curator of first TEDx, founder of MIT Deshpande Center for Technological Innovation, former vice provost for innovation at University of Southern California
- John Legere – CEO of T-Mobile, post-graduate school, received M.S. from MIT
- Nikolaos Mavridis – founder of the Interactive Robots and Media Lab
- David McGrath – founder of TAD Resources, now part of Adecco
- Dana G. Mead – former CEO and chair of Tenneco
- Hamid R. Moghadam – co-founder, chairman and CEO of Prologis
- Stewart Nelson – founder of Systems Concepts
- Eric P. Newman – numismatist
- Arthur S. Obermayer – founder of the Moleculon Research Corporation; philanthropist
- John Ofori-Tenkorang – director general of the Social Security and National Insurance Trust, Ghana
- Generoso Pope – founder and owner of The National Enquirer
- Alexander N. Rossolimo – founding chairman of Center for Security and Social Progress
- Michael J. Saylor – founder of MicroStrategy
- Alan Spoon (B.S. 1973) – former president of the Washington Post Company
- Leelila Strogov – general assignment reporter for Fox 11 News
- Richard Tomlinson – British intelligence officer
- Helmut Weymar – founder of Commodities Corporation
- Chris Wright – CEO of Liberty Energy

== Education ==
- Muhammad M. Al-Saggaf (M.S. 1996, PhD 2000 in Geophysics) – president of King Fahd University of Petroleum and Minerals
- Theodosios Alexander (M.S. in Naval Architecture and Marine Engineering 1982; M.S. in Ocean Systems Management; M.S. in Mechanical Engineering; ScD in Mechanical Engineering 1987) – dean of Parks College of Engineering, Aviation and Technology of Saint Louis University; professor and chair of Energy Engineering, Queen Mary, University of London; former James Watt Professor at the University of Glasgow, Scotland; former Mechanical Engineering professor at Washington University in St. Louis
- Joseph E. Aoun (PhD 1982) – president of Northeastern University, linguist, author
- Andrew Armacost (M.S. 1995, PhD 2000) – dean of the United States Air Force Academy
- Dennis Assanis (M.S. in Naval Architecture and Marine Engineering 1983, M.S. in Mechanical Engineering 1983, M.S. in Management 1986, PhD in Power and Propulsion 1986) – former Jon R. and Beverly S. Holt Professor and Arthur F. Thurnau Professor at the University of Michigan; provost and senior VP for Academic Affairs at Stony Brook University
- Larry Bacow (B.S. 1972) – president of Harvard University, former president of Tufts University, lawyer, economist, author
- Merrill J. Bateman (PhD 1965) – former president of Brigham Young University; Mormon Presiding Bishop
- Scott C. Beardsley – dean of the University of Virginia Darden School of Business
- Lawrence Berk (B.S. Architectural Engineering 1932) – founder and former president of Berklee College of Music (1945–1978)
- William R. Brody (B.S. 1965, M.S. 1966) – former president of Johns Hopkins University, current president of Salk Institute
- Emily Calandrelli (M.S. 2013) – aerospace engineer and STEM communicator
- Marion Hamilton Carter (1893) – educator, journalist, author
- Jared Cohon (M.S. 1972, PhD 1973) – former president of Carnegie Mellon University
- William Cooper (PhD 1976) – president of University of Richmond
- Dianna Leilani Cowern (2011) – physics alumnus and STEM educator and communicator on YouTube and elsewhere as a YouTuber and similar as "Physics Girl" collaborating often with fellow MIT graduate Emily Calandrelli and many other people associated with many other organizations
- Allan Cullimore – former president of New Jersey Institute of Technology (1920–1947)
- Woodie Flowers (M.S. 1968, ME 1971, PhD 1973) – MIT professor, created Introduction to Design (2.70), founder of FIRST Robotics Competition, starting host of Scientific American Frontiers (1990–93)
- Philip Friedman (PhD 1972) – president of Golden Gate University
- Thomas P. Gerrity – former dean of Wharton School at the University of Pennsylvania
- Hollis Godfrey (1889) – former president of Drexel University
- Eric Grimson (PhD Mathematics 1980) – computer scientist and chancellor of MIT
- Michelle S. Hoo Fatt (B.S 1987, M.S. 1990 and Ph.D. 1992) – professor of mechanical engineering at the University of Akron
- Amos Horev (B.S., M.S.) – former president of Technion
- Shirley Jackson (B.S. 1968, PhD 1973) – president of Rensselaer Polytechnic Institute, physicist
- Martin C. Jischke (M.S., PhD 1968) – former president of Purdue University
- Theodora J. Kalikow (Sc.M. 1970) – former president of the University of Maine at Farmington and the University of Southern Maine
- Salman Khan – founder and executive director of Khan Academy
- Joseph Klafter – chemical physics professor, the eighth president of Tel Aviv University
- Martin C. Libicki (B.S. Mathematics) – professor at the Frederick S. Pardee RAND Graduate School in Santa Monica, California
- John Maeda (B.S., M.S. 1989) – former president of Rhode Island School of Design (2008–2013), graphic designer, computer scientist, author, venture capitalist
- Modesto Maidique (B.S. 1962, M.S. 1964, EE 1966, PhD 1970) – former president of Florida International University
- Julianne Malveaux (PhD 1980) – president of Bennett College
- Alan Marcus (PhD 1981) – economist; professor at the Carroll School of Management, Boston College; first recipient of the Mario Gabelli Endowed Professorship
- David McClain (PhD 1974) – president of University of Hawaii
- Frederic Mishkin (B.S. 1973, PhD 1976) – economist; professor at Columbia Business School; Board of Governors of the Federal Reserve System (2006–2008); appeared in the documentary Inside Job
- Leo E. Morton (M.S. 1987) – chancellor of University of Missouri-Kansas City
- Gretchen Ritter (Ph.D.) – dean of the Cornell University College of Arts and Sciences
- Richard Santagati (M.S. 1979) – former president of Merrimack College
- Rahmat Shoureshi – researcher, professor, and provost of New York Institute of Technology (NYIT)
- Reed Shuldiner (Ph.D. 1985) – Alvin L. Snowiss Professor of Law at the University of Pennsylvania Law School
- Nam-Pyo Suh (B.S. 1959, M.S. 1961) – president of KAIST (Korea Advanced Institute of Science and Technology)
- Lawrence H. Summers (B.S. 1975) – former president of Harvard University, economist, former presidential advisor
- Subra Suresh (ScD 1981) – former president of Carnegie Mellon University, former Director of the National Science Foundation, former dean of the School of Engineering at MIT
- Demetri Terzopoulos FRS FRSC (PhD 1984) – Academy Award-winning computer scientist, university professor, author, and entrepreneur
- Ahmed Tewfik (PhD 1987) – IEEE Signal Processing Society president, former chair of the Department of Electrical and Computer Engineering at the Cockrell School of Engineering at the University of Texas at Austin
- Lee T. Todd, Jr. (M.S. 1970, EE 1971, PhD 1974) – president of University of Kentucky
- Laura Tyson (PhD 1974) – chairman of the CEA under Clinton; former dean of the Haas School of Business; former dean of the London Business School
- Hal Varian (B.S. 1969) – chief economist at Google, founding dean of the School of Information at UC Berkeley
- Patrick Henry Winston (B.S. 1965, M.S. 1967, PhD 1970) – author of standard textbooks on artificial intelligence and programming languages, MIT professor, co-founded Ascent Technology
- Elisabeth Zinser (M.S. 1982) – president of Southern Oregon University

== Humanities, arts, and social sciences ==
=== Academics ===
- Saleem Ali (PhD 2001) – Blue and Gold Distinguished Professor of Energy and Environment at the University of Delaware, National Geographic Emerging Explorer, World Economic Forum Young Global Leader
- Harry Binswanger – philosopher, associate of Ayn Rand
- Michael Brame (PhD 1970) – professor of linguistics at the University of Washington
- Dan Massey – sexual freedom scholar, religious philosopher, human rights activist, chief engineer at BBN Technologies, and senior scientist at Science Applications International Corporation
- Charles Murray (M.S.; PhD Political Science 1974) – researcher, co-author of The Bell Curve – professor of Management Science and Engineering at Stanford University
- Ellen Swallow Richards (B.S. 1873) – founder of the modern home economics discipline; first woman admitted to MIT
- Ann Senghas (PhD 1995) – developmental psychologist, professor at Columbia University

=== Actors, directors, and other crew ===
- Dylan Bruno – actor; former model
- Yau-Man Chan (B.S. 1974) – contestant on Survivor: Figi and Survivor: Micronesia; table tennis player
- James Eckhouse (1976, dropped out) – actor, Beverly Hills, 90210
- Herbert Kalmus (1903) – inventor of Technicolor; star on the Hollywood Walk of Fame
- Charlie Korsmo (2000) - actor; lawyer, the film adaptation of Dick Tracy, Hook, and Can't Hardly Wait
- Tohoru Masamune (B.S. Chemical Engineering 1982) – actor, Teenage Mutant Ninja Turtles, Inception, Never Have I Ever
- Saladin K. Patterson (1994) – developer and executive producer of The Wonder Years revival
- Erland Van Lidth De Jeude – Hollywood actor; opera singer
- James Woods (1969, dropped out) – Hollywood actor; Oscar nominee; Emmy winner
- Dottie Zicklin (1986) – television writer and producer; co-creator of the sitcoms Caroline in the City, Dharma & Greg, and Are You There, Chelsea?
- Bridget Mendler (2020) – former child actress; star on Disney productions including Good Luck Charlie and Lemonade Mouth

=== Economists, correspondents, and political advisors ===
- Nariman Behravesh (born 1948) – economist
- Alan Carlin (born 1937) – economist at the United States Environmental Protection Agency
- Dean Karlan (PhD Development Economics and Public Finance 2002) – development economist and founder of Innovations for Poverty Action
- Paul Krugman (PhD) – New York Times columnist, John Bates Clark Medal and Nobel Prize winner
- Robert J. Shiller (born 1946) – Nobel Prize-winning economist, academic, and author
- David Walter – British BBC and ITN correspondent; political advisor; winner of Kennedy Memorial Scholarship to MIT

=== Musicians, record producers, and engineers ===
- Nate Greenslit (PhD) – musician, writer and academic
- Ned Lagin – played keyboards and synthesizer at a number of the Grateful Dead shows between 1970 and 1975 and on a few mid–1970s albums
- Rajesh Mehta (B.S. Humanities and Engineering 1986) – hybrid trumpeter, composer, educational technology consultant
- Alan Pierson (B.S. Music, Physics, 1996–1997) – conductor; Northwestern University faculty
- Tom Scholz – founding member and guitarist of the band Boston
- Tom Scott (B.S. 1966) – winner of two Academy Awards for Best Sound for The Right Stuff and Amadeus
- Jamshied Sharifi – Tony Award-winning composer

=== Painting, sculpting, and visual art ===
- Alia Farid – contemporary artist
- Marisa Morán Jahn (M.S.) – multimedia artist and founder of Studio REV-
- Alan Rath (B.S. 1982) – electronic, kinetic, and robotic sculptor
- Samuel Washington Weis – painter

=== Writers and editors ===
- Steve Altes (B.S. 1984, M.S. 1986) – humorist, National Medal of Technology recipient, writer of Geeks & Greeks graphic novel about MIT
- John W. Campbell (physics, dropped out) – writer, longtime editor of Astounding Science Fiction
- Rebecca Richardson Joslin – essayist, lecturer, benefactor, clubwoman
- Kealoha, born Steven Wong (1999) – performance poet; Hawaii's first Poet Laureate and National Poetry Slam Legend; storyteller; Hawaii's SlamMaster
- Hugh Lofting – author of Dr. Dolittle series of books; trained at MIT as civil engineer, 1904–05
- Megan Miranda – mystery and thriller novelist
- John Shelton Reed (B.S. 1964) – sociologist, author of The Enduring South, elected to the Fellowship of Southern Writers

== Science and technology ==
- 15 – computer scientist and software engineer, creator of 15.ai
- Colin Adams – mathematician, knot theory expert, teacher, writer, math humorist
- Rakesh Agrawal – National Medal of Technology and Innovation laureate, professor of Chemical Engineering at Purdue University
- Buzz Aldrin – combat pilot, astronaut, second man to walk on the Moon
- Hillary Diane Andales – astrophysicist and science communicator
- Pauline Morrow Austin – meteorologist, Director of Weather Radar at MIT, research staff in Radiation Laboratory
- Milo Backus – geophysicist, Dave P. Carlton Centennial Professor of geophysics
- Adrian Bejan – professor of mechanical engineering, namesake of the Bejan number
- Gordon Bell – computer engineer and manager, designer of DEC PDP, manager of the VAX project
- Marc Blank – computer game designer and programmer, developed Zork adventure game
- Manuel Blum – computer scientist, received Turing Award (1995) for studies in computational complexity theory
- Katie Bouman – computer scientist and electrical engineer involved in developing the algorithm used in filtering the first images of a black hole taken by the Event Horizon Telescope
- Dan Bricklin – co-inventor of Visicalc, the first WYSIWYG PC spreadsheet program
- Alice G. Bryant – otolaryngologist and inventor of surgical tools
- Dixie Lee Bryant – geologist and educator
- Edward M. Burgess – chemist, inventor of the Burgess reagent
- Christopher Chen – William Fairfield Warren Distinguished Professor of Biomedical Engineering at Boston University
- David D. Clark – led the development of TCP/IP (the protocol that underlies the Internet)
- Wesley A. Clark – computing pioneer, creator of the LINC (the first minicomputer)
- Fernando Corbató – retired MIT professor, Turing Award (1990), co-founder of the Multics project
- Shiladitya DasSarma (PhD 1985) – pioneering microbiologist and professor at University of Maryland School of Medicine who deciphered genetic code for Halobacterium NRC-1
- Peter J. Denning (M.S. 1965, PhD 1968) – computer scientist, professor, co-founder of the Multics project, pioneered virtual memory
- Jack Dennis – retired MIT professor, co-founder of the Multics project
- Peter Diamandis – founder and chairman of the X PRIZE Foundation, co-founder and chairman of Singularity University, and co-author of New York Times bestseller Abundance: The Future Is Better Than You Think
- Whitfield Diffie – pioneer of public-key cryptography and the Diffie-Hellman protocol, Turing Award (2015)
- K. Eric Drexler – pioneer nanotechnologist, author, co-founded Foresight Institute
- Harold Eugene "Doc" Edgerton (M.S. 1927, ScD 1931) – former MIT Institute professor; co-founder, and the "E", of EG&G; stroboscope photography pioneer; Oscar winner 1940
- Theodore Miller Edison (1898–1992) – only child of Thomas Alva Edison who graduated from college; inventor with over 80 patents
- Farouk El-Baz – supervisor of Lunar Science Planning, Apollo Program, NASA
- Aprille Ericsson (B.S. Aero/Astro 1986) – aerospace engineer
- Kelly Falkner (PhD 1989) – oceanographer, Antarctic researcher
- Bran Ferren (Class of 1974) – designer, technologist, engineer, entertainment technology expert, prolific inventor, Academy Award nominee
- Carl Feynman – computer scientist; son of the physicist Richard Feynman
- Michael Fincke (B.S. Aero/Astro 1989, SB EAPS 1989) – NASA astronaut, ISS commander and former record-holder for time in space
- Marron William Fort (B.S. 1926, M.S. 1927, PhD 1933) – first African-American to earn a PhD in engineering
- Bob Frankston (B.S. 1970, M.S. EE 1974) – co-inventor of Visicalc (first WYSIWYG PC spreadsheet program); critic of telecommunications public policy
- Limor Fried – open-source hardware pioneer, founder of Adafruit Industries
- Simson Garfinkel – journalist, author, computer security researcher, entrepreneur, computer science professor
- Ivan Getting (S.B. Physics, 1933) – co-inventor of the Global Positioning System (GPS), Draper Prize (2003)
- Jim Gettys – an original developer of X Window, former director of GNOME
- Yoshimi Goda – coastal engineer and recipient of the Order of the Sacred Treasure; undertook research at MIT with Arthur Ippen
- Kenneth E. Goodson – mechanical engineer and faculty at Stanford University
- Martha Goodway – archaeometallurgist at the Smithsonian Institution
- Bill Gosper (B.S. 1965) – mathematician, a founder of the original hacker community, pioneer of symbolic computing, originator of hashlife
- Julia R. Greer (B.S. 1997) – materials science professor at Caltech, pioneer in the fields of nanomechanics and architected materials, CNN 2020 Visionary
- Gerald Guralnik (B.S. 1958) – professor of Physics, Brown University; co-discoverer of Higgs mechanism and Higgs boson in 1964 with C.R. Hagen; awarded J. J. Sakurai Prize for Theoretical Particle Physics in 2010
- C. R. Hagen (B.S., M.S. 1958, PhD. 1963) – professor of Physics, University of Rochester; co-discoverer of Higgs mechanism and Higgs boson in 1964 with Gerald Guralnik; awarded J. J. Sakurai Prize for Theoretical Particle Physics in (2010)
- George Ellery Hale – astronomer, founded several astronomical observatories, developed Throop College of Technology into Caltech
- Heidi Hammel (B.S. 1982) – planetary astronomer who has extensively studied Neptune and Uranus
- Karen Hao (B.S. 2015), award-winning AI journalist
- William W. Happ (M.S.) – silicon transistor pioneer at Shockley Semiconductor Laboratory, and Professor at Arizona State University
- Guadalupe Hayes-Mota (B.S. 2008, M.S. 2016, MBA 2016) – biotechnologist and business director
- Asegun Henry (M.S., PhD 2009) – mechanical engineer
- Caroline Herzenberg (B.S. 1953) – physicist
- Julian W. Hill (PhD 1928) – inventor of nylon
- C.-T. James Huang (PhD 1982) – generative linguist, Professor and Director of Graduate Studies at Harvard, Fellow of the Linguistic Society of America (2015), recipient of the Linguistic Society of Taiwan's Lifetime Achievement Award (2014)
- David A. Huffman – computer scientist known for Huffman coding used in lossless data compression
- Jerome C. Hunsaker (M.S. 1912, ScD 1923) – pioneering aeronautical engineer, airship designer, former head of MIT Mechanical Engineering Department
- Anya Hurlbert (PhD, 1989) – visual neuroscientist
- William Jeffrey – defense technology expert, former director of National Institute of Standards and Technology
- Thomas Kailath – entrepreneur, retired Stanford professor, IEEE Medal of Honor (2007)
- Rudolf E. Kálmán – electrical engineer, theoretical mathematician, co-inventor of Kalman Filter algorithm, Draper Prize (2008)
- Jordin Kare – high energy laser physicist, developer of "mosquito laser zapper"
- Gregor Kiczales – computer scientist, professor at the University of British Columbia, Fellow of the Association for Computing Machinery
- Leonard Kleinrock (M.S. Electrical Engineering 1959, PhD Computer Science 1963) – computing and Internet pioneer, one of the key group of designers of the original ARPANET
- Henry Kloss (1953, dropped out) – audio engineer; entrepreneur; founder of Acoustic Research, KLH, Advent, Kloss Video, Cambridge SoundWorks, Tivoli Audio
- Loren Kohnfelder – introduced the term "public key certificate" for public key cryptography in secure network communication
- Raymond Kurzweil (B.S. 1970) – inventor, entrepreneur in music synthesizers, OCR and speech-to-text processing
- Leslie Lamport (B.S. 1960) – computing pioneer in temporal logic, developer of LaTeX, winner of the Turing Award (2013)
- Robert S. Langer – biochemical engineer, biomedical researcher, MIT professor, inventor, entrepreneur, Draper Prize (2002)
- Norman Levinson (B.S., M.S. 1934, ScD 1935) – theoretical mathematician, former Institute Professor at MIT, developed Levinson recursion
- Daniel Levitin – neuroscientist, music producer, author of This Is Your Brain on Music
- Soung Chang Liew (B.S. 1984, M.S. 1986, PhD 1988) – information engineering professor
- Steven R. Little (PhD 2005) – chemical engineer, pharmaceutical scientist, and department chair of Chemical Engineering at the University of Pittsburgh Swanson School of Engineering
- Maureen D. Long (PhD 2006) – observational seismologist
- Edward Norton Lorenz – mathematician, meteorologist, MIT professor emeritus, invented chaos theory, discovered Lorenz attractor
- Joseph Lykken (PhD 1982) – theoretical physicist, proposed "weak scale superstring" theory
- Luz Martinez-Miranda – physicist and professor at the University of Maryland; first female president of the National Society of Hispanic Physicists
- Hiram Percy Maxim – inventor of the "Maxim Silencer" and founder of the American Radio Relay League
- John F. McCarthy Jr. (B.S. 1950, M.S. 1951) – director of MIT Center for Space Research and director of Lewis Research Center, NASA
- Douglas McIlroy (PhD 1959) – mathematician, software engineer, professor, developed component-based software engineering, an original developer of Unix, member of National Academy of Engineering
- Diane McKnight (B.S. 1975, M.S. 1978, PhD 1979) – engineering professor, limnologist, biogeochemist, Antarctic researcher
- Anne McNeil (Postdoc 2005–2007) – chemist and professor at University of Michigan
- Faye McNeill (PhD 2005) – atmospheric chemist and Professor of Chemical Engineering at Columbia University
- Parisa Mehrkhodavandi (PhD 2002) – chemist
- Fulvio Melia (PhD 1985) – theoretical astrophysicist, professor, author, editor, general educator
- Holly Michael (PhD 2005) – hydrogeologist and professor
- Arnold Mindell (MSc 1961) – physicist, author, psychologist – developer of Process Oriented Psychology
- Daniel Mindiola – professor of chemistry at University of Pennsylvania
- Douglas J. Mink (B.S. 1973, M.S. 1974) – astronomer, software developer, co-discovered rings around Uranus, bicycling activist
- Bill Parker – artist, engineer, inventor of the modern plasma lamp
- Bradford Parkinson – co-inventor of the Global Positioning System (GPS), Draper Prize (2003)
- Robert A. "Bob" Pease (B.S. 1961) – analog integrated circuit design expert, technical author
- Irene Pepperberg (B.S. 1969) – Brandeis University professor, researcher in animal cognition, trained Alex (parrot)
- Alan Perlis (M.S. 1949, PhD 1950) – computer scientist, professor, pioneer of programming languages, winner of the first Turing Award (1966)
- Radia Perlman (B.S. 1973, M.S. 1976, PhD 1988) – computer scientist, network engineer, invented numerous data network technologies, "mother of the Internet"
- David Pesetsky (PhD 1982) – generative linguist, Ferrari P. Ward Professor of Modern Languages and Linguistics, head of the Department of Linguistics and Philosophy at MIT
- Harry Melville Pope (1881) – gunsmith noted for precision rifling of gun barrels
- Ronald T. Raines (B.S. Chemistry 1980, B.S. Biology 1980) – chemical biologist, entrepreneur, and MIT professor
- Edward Rebar (PhD 1997) – biologist, senior vice president, and chief technology officer at Sangamo Therapeutics
- ChoKyun Rha (B.S. 1962, M.S. 1964, M.S. 1966, SCD 1967) – food technologist, professor at MIT
- Adam Riess (B.S. 1992) – physicist, Nobel Prize winner in Physics awarded in 2011 for demonstrating the acceleration of the universe's rate of expansion
- Louis W. Roberts (PhD 1946) – microwave physicist, chief of the Microwave Laboratory at NASA's Electronics Research Center, director of the John A. Volpe National Transportation Systems Center
- Jerome Saltzer – retired MIT professor, timesharing computing pioneer, co-founder of the Multics project, Director of Project Athena
- Frederick P. Salvucci (B.S. 1961, M.S. 1962) – civil engineer, transportation planner, MIT professor, former Massachusetts secretary of transportation, public transit advocate, Big Dig advocate
- George W. Santos – pioneer in bone marrow transplantation
- David G. Schaeffer (PhD 1968) – mathematician, James B. Duke Professor at Duke University
- Bob Scheifler – computer scientist, leader of the X Window System project, architect of Jini
- Julie Segre – epithelial biologist, Chief of the Human Genome Research Institute
- Oliver Selfridge – computer scientist, father of machine perception
- Claude Shannon – mathematician, electrical engineer, and cryptographer known as the "father of information theory"
- Reuben Shaw (PhD 1999) – cancer researcher at the Salk Institute for Biological Studies and director of one of the National Cancer Institute's seven basic laboratory cancer centers in the US
- Philip J. Siemens (B.S. 1965) – theoretical physicist
- Amy B. Smith (B.S. 1984, M.S. 1995) – mechanical engineer, inventor, former Peace Corps volunteer, MIT senior lecturer and researcher in appropriate technology, MacArthur Fellow (2004)
- Oliver R. Smoot – namesake of the smoot unit of measurement, former chair of ANSI; former president of ISO
- Richard M. Stallman (grad student, dropped out) – computer programmer; Free Software activist; creator of EMACS editor, GNU; MacArthur Fellow (1990)
- Guy L. Steele, Jr. (M.S. 1977, PhD 1980) – computer scientist, programming language expert, an original editor of the Jargon File (Hacker's Dictionary)
- Richard Stratt (B.S. 1975) – professor of physical chemistry at Brown University
- Mahmooda Sultana (PhD 2010) – NASA research engineer
- Bert Sutherland (M.S., PhD) – managed research laboratories, including Sun Microsystems Laboratories (1992–1998), the Systems Science Laboratory at Xerox PARC (1975–1981), and the Computer Science Division of Bolt, Beranek and Newman
- Ivan Sutherland (PhD 1963) – computer graphics pioneer, former professor, ARPAnet and Internet pioneer, co-founded Evans & Sutherland, Turing Award (1988)
- Lynne Talley (PhD 1982) – physical oceanographer, professor
- Badri Nath Tandon (1961) – gastroenterologist, textbook author, Sasakawa WHO Health Prize and Padma Bhushan winner
- Andrew S. Tanenbaum (B.S. 1965) – computer scientist, professor, textbook author (operating systems), creator of Minix (the precursor to Linux)
- Frederick Terman – electrical engineer; former provost of Stanford University; "father of Silicon Valley"
- Ray Tomlinson – innovator of email systems, pioneered the use of the "@" symbol for email
- Leonard H. Tower Jr. (B.S. Biology 1971) – early Free Software activist, software hacker
- John Trump – electrical engineer, inventor, and physicist; professor at MIT 1936–1973, directed MIT High Voltage Research Laboratory 1946–1980
- Kay Tye – neuroscientist, MIT assistant professor
- Ann M. Valentine – chemist, professor at Yale and Temple University
- Manuel Sandoval Vallarta – MIT professor, founder of the Physics Institute at UNAM; mentor of Nobel laureate Richard Feynman
- Denisa Wagner – vascular biologist at Harvard Medical School
- Susie Wee – Women in Technology International laureate; CTEO of Collaboration at Cisco
- Robert Williams Wood – optical physicist, developed "black light", ultraviolet and infrared photography
- Joshua Wurman – meteorologist, inventor, developed the Doppler On Wheels, Bistatic Weather Radar Networks, founder and president of Flexible Array for Radar and Mesonets (FARM), formerly CSWR
- Jenny Y Yang (PhD 2007) – chemist
- Edward Yourdon – computer pioneer, author, lecturer, popularized the term "Y2K Bug"
- Gregorio Y. Zara – inventor of the first two-way videophone; National Scientist of the Philippines
- Günter M. Ziegler – mathematician, Free University of Berlin professor, ex-president of the German Mathematical Society, recipient of the Chauvenet and Leroy P. Steele prizes

== Sports ==
- Jimmy Bartolotta (2009) – professional basketball player
- Charles Butt, Jr. (1941) – rowing coach
- Adam Edelman (2014) – American-born Israeli Olympic skeleton athlete
- Johan Harmenberg (dropped out in 1975; drafted by Sweden) – épée fencer, gold medal winner in the 1980 Olympics, world champion
- Larry Kahn – tiddlywinks champion
- Dave Lockwood (1975) – tiddlywinks champion
- Jeff Sagarin (1970) – sports statistician
- Zeke Sanborn – Olympic gold medalist
- Jason Szuminski (2000) – major league pitcher
- Steve Tucker (1991) – two-time member of the US Olympic rowing team

== Miscellaneous ==
- Katy Croff Bell (B.S. Ocean Engineering 2000) – National Geographic explorer
- Sylvester Q. Cannon (B.S. Mining Engineering) – apostle of The Church of Jesus Christ of Latter-Day Saints
- Csaba Csere (1978 B.S., 2 Mechanical Engineering) – automotive journalist, editor of Car and Driver
- Lynn Yamada Davis (1977 B.S., Civil Engineering) – celebrity chef, TikToker
- Janet Hsieh (2001) – Taiwanese-American television personality, violinist, author, and model; host of Fun Taiwan
- Jeff Hwang – US Air Force fighter pilot, 1999 winner of Mackay Trophy
- J. Kenji López-Alt (2002 B.S., 4, Architecture) – celebrity chef, author of The Food Lab: Better Home Cooking Through Science
- Ray Magliozzi (1972 B.S., 21B, Humanities and Science) – radio personality, Car Talk
- Tom Magliozzi (1958 B.S., 14A, Economic Policy and Engineering) – radio personality, Car Talk
- Lalit Pande (1972 M.S., 2 Mechanical Engineering) – environmentalist and Padma Shri awardee
- Randal Pinkett – chairman and CEO of BCT Partners; winner of television show The Apprentice
- Ubol Ratana (1973 B.S., 18 Mathematics) – princess of Thailand
- Aafia Siddiqui (1995 B.S., 7 Biology / Life Science) – neuroscientist; alleged Al-Qaeda operative; convicted of assaulting with a deadly weapon and attempting to kill US soldiers and FBI agents
- Ellen Spertus (1990 B.S., 1992 M.S., 1998 PhD, Computer Science) – professor, computer scientist, 2001's "Sexiest Geek Alive"
- Kelvin Teo (M.S. 2006) – young entrepreneur and season 1 winner of Malaysian reality show Love Me Do
- Robert Varkonyi (1983 B.S., 15 Management, 1983 SB, 6 Computer Science and Engineering) – winner of the 2002 World Series of Poker Main Event

== Fictional ==
- Gordon Freeman, the silent protagonist of Half-Life, graduated at MIT with a Ph.D. degree in Theoretical Physics
- Lex Luthor, diabolical genius and supervillain of the DC Universe
- Tim McGee, field agent specializing in cybersecurity and computer crime on NCIS, portrayed by Sean Murray
- Tony Stark, alter ego of Iron Man, portrayed by Robert Downey Jr. in the Marvel Cinematic Universe films
- Howard Wolowitz, character on The Big Bang Theory, portrayed by Simon Helberg

== Nobel laureate alumni ==
As of April 2011, the MIT Office of the Provost said that 76 Nobel awardees had or currently have a formal connection to MIT. Of this group, 32 have earned MIT degrees (MIT has never awarded honorary degrees in any form).

Name	Degree	Degree year	Award year	Award	Citation	Notes
George Akerlof	PhD	1966	2001	Economics	"for their analyses of markets with asymmetric information"	
Sid Altman	B.S.	1960	1989	Chemistry	"for their discovery of catalytic properties of RNA"	
Kofi Annan	M.S.	1972	2001	Peace	"for their work for a better organized and more peaceful world"	
Robert Aumann	M.S.	1952	2005	Economics	"for having enhanced our understanding of conflict and cooperation through game-theory analysis"	
Elias James Corey	B.S. – Chemistry PhD – Chemistry	1948 1951	1990	Chemistry	"for his development of the theory and methodology of organic synthesis"	
Eric Cornell	PhD	1990	2001	Physics	"for the achievement of Bose-Einstein condensation in dilute gases of alkali atoms, and for early fundamental studies of the properties of the condensates"	
Peter Diamond	PhD	1963	2010	Economics	"for [the] analysis of markets with search frictions"	
Richard Feynman	B.S.	1939	1965	Physics	"for their fundamental work in quantum electrodynamics, with deep-ploughing consequences for the physics of elementary particles"	
Andrew Z. Fire	PhD	1983	2006	Medicine/Physiology	"for their discovery of RNA interference – gene silencing by double-stranded RNA"	
Murray Gell-Mann	PhD	1951	1969	Physics	"for his contributions and discoveries concerning the classification of elementary particles and their interactions"	
Leland H. Hartwell	PhD	1964	2001	Medicine/Physiology	"for their discoveries of key regulators of the cell cycle"	
H. Robert Horvitz	B.S.	1968	2002	Medicine/Physiology	"for their discoveries concerning 'genetic regulation of organ development and programmed cell death'"	
Henry W. Kendall	B.S., PhD	1948, 1951	1990	Physics	"for their pioneering investigations concerning deep inelastic scattering of electrons on protons and bound neutrons, which have been of essential importance for the development of the quark model in particle physics"	
Lawrence Klein	PhD	1944	1980	Economics	"for the creation of econometric models and the application to the analysis of economic fluctuations and economic policies"	
Paul Krugman	PhD	1977	2008	Economics	"for his analysis of trade patterns and location of economic activity"	
Robert B. Laughlin	PhD	1979	1998	Physics	"for their discovery of a new form of quantum fluid with fractionally charged excitations"	
Robert C. Merton	PhD	1970	1997	Economics	"for a new method to determine the value of derivatives"	
Robert S. Mulliken	B.S. – Chemistry	1917	1966	Chemistry	"for his fundamental work concerning chemical bonds and the electronic structure of molecules by the molecular orbital method"	
Robert Mundell	PhD	1956	1999	Economics	"for his analysis of monetary and fiscal policy under different exchange rate regimes and his analysis of optimum currency areas"	
William D. Nordhaus	PhD	1967	2018	Economics	"for integrating climate change into long-run macroeconomic analysis"	
Charles Pedersen	M.S.	1927	1987	Chemistry	"for their development and use of molecules with structure-specific interactions of high selectivity"	
William D. Phillips	PhD	1976	1997	Physics	"for development of methods to cool and trap atoms with laser light"	
Burton Richter	B.S., PhD	1952, 1956	1976	Physics	"for their pioneering work in the discovery of a heavy elementary particle of a new kind"	
Adam Riess	B.S.	1992	2011	Physics	"for the discovery of the accelerating expansion of the Universe through observations of distant supernovae"	
John Robert Schrieffer	B.S.	1953	1972	Physics	"for their jointly developed theory of superconductivity, usually called the BCS-theory"	
William Shockley	PhD	1936	1956	Physics	"for their researches on semiconductors and their discovery of the transistor effect"	
George F. Smoot	B.S., PhD	1966, 1970	2006	Physics	"for their discovery of the blackbody form and anisotropy of the cosmic microwave background radiation"	
Joseph Stiglitz	PhD	1966	2001	Economics	"for their analyses of markets with asymmetric information"	
Carl E. Wieman	B.S.	1973	2001	Physics	"for the achievement of Bose-Einstein condensation in dilute gases of alkali atoms, and for early fundamental studies of the properties of the condensates"	
Robert Burns Woodward	B.S.	1936	1965	Chemistry	"for his outstanding achievements in the art of organic synthesis"	
