= Lalit Pande =

- Born: Almora district, Uttarakhand, India
- Education: The Doon School; Indian Institute of Technology, New Delhi; Massachusetts Institute of Technology
- Occupation: Environmentalist
- Known for: Environmental education, sustainability in ecologically fragile regions of Uttarakhand
- Spouse: Anuradha Pande
- Parent: B. D. Pande
- Awards: Padma Shri; IIT Delhi Distinguished Alumni Award

Lalit Pande is an Indian social worker, environmentalist and the founder of Uttarakhand Seva Nidhi Environmental Education Centre, a non governmental organization promoting environmental education in the hilly areas of the Indian state of Uttarakhand. Under the aegis of the organization, Pande is known to have introduced community educational programmes focused on environment and development and supported over 200 community based organizations in the state. The Government of India awarded him the fourth highest civilian honour of the Padma Shri, in 2007, for his contributions to environmental education.

== Biography ==
Lalit Pande was born in a socially known Almora family to Vimla Pande and Bhairav Dutt Pande, an Indian Civil Service officer, a 1972 Padma Shri recipient and a former Governor of the states of West Bengal and Punjab. His uncle, Vinod Pande, was also a former Governor and a Cabinet Secretary and his sister-in-law, Mrinal Pande, is a Padma Shri award winning journalist and the author of The Other Country: Dispatches from the Mofussil. His schooling was at The Doon School, the Dehradun based premier educational institution, and graduated in Engineering from the Indian Institute of Technology, Delhi, in 1970. Later, moving to Cambridge, he secured a master's degree from the Massachusetts Institute of Technology (MIT) in 1972.

Returning to India, he worked in various places, including at Cadbury's, but shifted back to the US to pursue his doctoral studies and gained a doctoral degree (PhD) from Purdue University in 1982. Eschewing a regular job, he went to his ancestral town of Almora, a hilly region in Uttarakhand, in 1984, where he started a non governmental organization, Uttarakhand Seva Nidhi Paryavaran Shiksha Sansthan (USNPSS), Uttarakhand Seva Nidhi for short, to start his social career. Securing a grant of ₹200,000 from the Government of India, under the New Education Policy of 1986, the organization functioned from a room at Pande's residence and worked for promoting environmental education in the state. Over the years, they are reported to have been successful in introducing environmental education as a subject in the middle school curriculum of the state, which is related to the topics of food, fodder, water, trees, crops, soil, manure and rainfall. They are also supporting over 300 pre-primary schools in the state. The organization is associated with agencies such as UNESCO, in the matters related to environmental sustainability and Pande serves as the director of the Uttarakhand Seva Nidhi Environmental Education Centre. He is also involved with the other issues of social interest in the state.

The Government of India awarded him the civilian honour of the Padma Shri in 2007. His alma mater, the Indian Institute of Technology, Delhi, awarded him the Distinguished Alumni Award in 2014. Pande is married to Anuradha, who is also involved in his social activities, attending to the women's forums of the Uttarakhand Seva Nidhi. Lalit Pande died in Almora on 15 November 2026, at the age of 78.

== See also ==
- List of Massachusetts Institute of Technology alumni
