= Badri Nath Tandon =

Indian gastroenterologist (1931–2018)

- Born: 1 August 1931; India
- Died: 5 March 2018 (aged 86); New Delhi, India
- Occupations: Gastroenterologist; Hepatologist; Medical academic
- Years active: Since 1962
- Known for: Gastroenterology; Hepatology; Child nutrition
- Awards: Padma Bhushan; Sasakawa WHO Health Prize; RAMS Jubilee Medal; Kent Memorial Award; IMA Lifetime Achievement Award; ISG Lifetime Achievement Award

Badri Nath Tandon (1 August 1931 – 5 March 2018) was an Indian gastroenterologist, hepatologist, medical researcher and academic, and the chairman and senior consultant of gastroenterology, at Metro Hospitals and Heart Institute, Noida. He is a former professor and head of Department of Gastroenterology and Human Nutrition Unit at the All India Institute of Medical Sciences, Delhi (AIIMS) and a former director and senior consultant of hepatology and gastroenterology at Pushpawati Singhania Research Institute for Liver, Renal and Digestive Diseases, New Delhi. He is a recipient of several awards, including Sasakawa WHO Health Prize and Jubilee Medal of the RAMS. The Government of India awarded him the third highest civilian honour of the Padma Bhushan, in 1986, for his contributions to medicine.

== Biography ==
Badri Nath Tandon, born on 1 August 1931 in a Khatri family, graduated in medicine (MBBS) from King George Medical College, Lucknow and secured his post-graduate degree (MD) from the same institution. Subsequently, he joined Harvard Medical School, Boston for advanced training in gastroenterology followed by training in Nutrition Science at the Massachusetts Institute of Technology, Cambridge. He started his career at All India Institute of Medical Sciences (AIIMS) in 1962 as a member of faculty where he stayed till 1991. It was during this period he founded the Department of Gastroenterology at AIIMS, serving the department as its head and as a Professor at the Human Nutrition Unit till his superannuation from AIIMS service on 31 August 1991. In 1993, he shifted to Pushpawati Singhania Research Institute for Liver, Renal and Digestive Diseases, New Delhi as its director and senior consultant and served the institution till 2000 when he moved to Metro Group of Hospitals, Noida as its chairman, a post he holds till date.

Tandon was associated with several medical and socio-medical initiatives. When the Integrated Child Development Services (Anganwadi) scheme was introduced in India, with assistance from UNICEF, in 1975, he chaired the technical committee of the program from inception till 1995. He served as the chairman of the Task Force of Liver Diseases initiated by the Indian Council of Medical Research (ICMR) and is the incumbent chair of the Digestive Diseases Foundation of India and the Digestive Diseases Research Foundation. He has been the president of such societies as International Association of Liver Diseases, Asian Pacific Association for the Study of Liver, Indian Society of Gastroenterology and Nutrition Society of India (1995–99) and the vice-president of the World Gastroenterology Organisation.

Tandon is known to have conducted pioneering research on bowel diseases, effects of malnutrition on intestine, pancreas and liver and the role of pathogens and food toxins in various diseases. His work on veno-occlusive disease of the liver helped in the discovery that pyrrolizidine alkaloids present in the Jhunjhunia seeds could cause the disease. He is also credited with the isolation of Hepatitis E virus and the introduction of a new therapeutic protocol of the Hepatitis E as well as Hepatitis C using herbal plants. His researches have been documented in over 225 medical papers and four monographs. He has also published two text books, Textbook Of Tropical Gastroenterology, and Tropical Hepato-Gastroenterology, and has contributed 13 chapters to text books written by others. Besides being the founder editor of Tropical Gastroenterology journal, he also sat on the editorial boards of several national and international journals; National Medical Journal, Ceylon Medical Journal, Asian Pacific Journal of Gastroenterology and Hepatology, Hepatology Communication, European Journal of Hepatology, Journal of Clinical Gastroenterology and Gastroenterology International counting among them.

Badri Nath Tandon died in New Delhi on 5 March 2018, at the age of 86.

== Awards and honors ==
Tandon was a Fellow of the National Academy of Medical Sciences, elected to the position in 1974. He was also a Fellow of the Indian National Science Academy, Indian Academy of Pediatrics, Indian Association of Preventive and Social Medicines and the Indian Public Health Association. The Government of India awarded him the civilian honor of the Padma Bhushan in 1986. He received the Sasakawa WHO Health Prize of the World Health Organization in 1990 and the Jubilee Medal of the Russian Academy of Medical Sciences in 1995. He delivered several award orations such as Dr. R.V. Rajam Oration (1983–84) of the National Academy of Medical Sciences, and was also a recipient of Kent Memorial Award of the National Homoeopathic Association (1998), Lifetime Achievement Award of the New Delhi chapter of the Indian Medical Association (2004) and the inaugural Lifetime Achievement Award of Indian society of Gastroenterology (2007).

== See also ==
- List of Massachusetts Institute of Technology alumni
- King George's Medical University
