= Ibn Sina Robot =

Android robot

The Ibn Sina Robot was an android robot created by roboticists Nikolaos Mavridis and Hanson Robotics founder David Hanson at United Arab Emirates University's Interactive Robots and Media Lab in 2009. It was described world's first android robot with Arabic language conversational abilities.

== Robot design ==
The robot is capable of facial expressions, hand gestures, Arabic language dialogue, face detection and face recognition.

It is part of an Interactive Theatre installation, within a circular room with a diameter of 13 meters, containing a stage, a projection screen, and sensors. Experimentation regarding multiple forms of tele-participation in the theatre is taking place; such as live interactions between physically present robots and humans with avatars in online virtual worlds, and remote control of robots through brain-computer interfacing.

The robot was demonstrated in the GITEX 2009 exhibition in Dubai, where it interacted with more than one thousand visitors, and has been featured in publications such as the UAE National, BBC, Agence France Press (AFP), and Al Jazeera.
