= Fatt =

Fatt may refer to:

- Arthur C. Fatt (1905–1999), American advertising executive
- Cheok Kon Fatt, Malaysian weightlifter
- Chong Yee Fatt, Malaysian football manager
- G Fatt (born 1992), Burmese singer and actor
- Jeff Fatt (born 1953), Australian musician and actor
- Lam Mun Fatt (born 1973), Malaysian field hockey player
- Michelle S. Hoo Fatt, American mechanical engineer
- Paul Fatt (1924–2014), British neuroscientist
- Tan Lee Fatt, Malaysian politician
- Wong Tien Fatt (1954-2019), Malaysian politician
