= Strogov =

Strogov is a surname. Notable people with the surname include:

- Leelila Strogov, American news reporter
- Yuliyan Strogov (born 1972), Bulgarian boxer
