= Alice Bryant =

Alice Bryant may refer to:

- Alice Franklin Bryant (1899–1977), American peace activist, author, educator, and electoral candidate
- Alice G. Bryant (1862–1942), American otorhinolaryngologist
