= Laser fence =

A laser fence or laser wall is a mechanism to detect objects passing the line of sight between the laser source and the detector. Stronger lasers can be used to injure entities passing the laser beam. In fiction, laser fences may have the ability to stop intruders by blocking or injuring them.

== Description ==
A laser fence mechanism detects objects passing the line of sight between a laser source and detector. Stronger lasers can be used to injure entities passing the laser beam, as in a mosquito laser. Fictional uses of laser fences often extend the concept so that fences may have the ability to prevent intruders by blocking or injuring them.

== Agricultural usage ==
Lasers are used to keep birds from eating blueberries by being perceived as a predator. The European Commission is funding research into a laser fence to scare away rats and other pests.

== Border fences ==
The Indian Border Security Force (BSF) has implemented a laser wall system—called LASER Wall—along some parts of its border to stop intrusion.

== In fiction ==
=== Films ===
In the 1992 film Fortress, prisoners are kept secured by laser walls. In the 1995 film Congo, a laser fence is used as part of other high-tech equipment to defend a camp against vicious gorillas.

=== Videogames ===
Laser walls appear frequently in videogames. The concepts of these fictional fences can be compared to other concepts like tractor or repulsor beams and force fields.

- Deus Ex: Human Revolution has laser grids which the player can remotely hack with the Remote Hacking augmentation.
- Monaco: What's Yours Is Mine has a hacker class which use viruses to shut down lasers.
- Portal 2, with laser barriers as obstacles
- Sly Cooper: Thieves in Time
- Titanfall 2 has laser fields to prevent access to areas.

== See also ==
- Laser Doppler velocimetry
- Lidar
