= Applied Microbiology and Biotechnology =

- Discipline: Microbiology and Biotechnology
- Language: English
- Edited by: Hermann J. Heipieper

Publication details
- History: 1975–present
- Publisher: Springer Science+Business Media
- Frequency: Biweekly
- Impact factor: 4.7 (2025)

Standard abbreviations
- ISO 4: Appl. Microbiol. Biotechnol.

Indexing
- ISSN: 0175-7598 (print); 1432-0614 (web)

Links
- Journal homepage; Online access

The Applied Microbiology and Biotechnology is a peer-reviewed biweekly journal publishes papers and mini-reviews of new and emerging products, processes and technologies in the area of prokaryotic or eukaryotic cells, relevant enzymes and proteins; applied genetics and molecular biotechnology; genomics and proteomics; applied microbial and cell physiology; environmental biotechnology; process and products and more.

== Abstracting and Indexing ==
The journal is abstracted and indexed in:

- Academic OneFile
- Academic Search
- AGRICOLA
- Aquatic Sciences and Fisheries Abstracts
- Biological Abstracts
- BIOSIS
- CAB Abstracts
- CAB International
- CEABA-VtB
- ChemWeb
- Chemical Abstracts Service
- CSA Environmental Sciences
- EBSCO databases
- EI-Compendex
- Elsevier Biobase
- EMBASE
- Environment Index
- Enology Abstracts
- Food Science and Technology Abstracts
- GEOBASE
- GeoRef
- Global Health
- Health Reference Center Academic
- Index to Scientific & Technical Proceedings
- INIS Atomindex
- ProQuest databases
- PubMed/Medline
- Referativnyi Zhurnal
- Vitis - Viticulture
- Science Citation Index
- Scopus

According to the Journal Citation Reports, the journal has a 2025 impact factor of 4.7.
