= ChoKyun Rha =

Korean-American engineering professor (1933–2021)

- ChoKyun Rha, from a 2021 newspaper obituary
- Born: October 5, 1933; Seoul, Korea
- Died: March 2, 2021; Boston, Massachusetts, US
- Occupation(s): Scientist, professor of biomaterials science and engineering

Korean name
- Hangul: 라초균
- RR: Ra Chogyun
- MR: Ra Ch'ogyun

ChoKyun Rha (October 5, 1933 – March 2, 2021) was a Korean-born American food technologist, inventor, and professor of biomaterials science and engineering at the Massachusetts Institute of Technology (MIT). She was the first Asian woman awarded tenure at MIT.

== Early life ==
ChoKyun Rha was born in Seoul, the daughter of SaeJin Rha and Young Soon Choi Rha. Her father was a physician and dean of the medical school at Seoul National University. She moved to the United States in 1956, and attended Miami University in Ohio, before enrolling at MIT as an undergraduate. She finished a bachelor's degree in 1962, with a senior thesis on the storage of dried scallions. She stayed at MIT to earn master's degrees in 1964 and 1966, and completed a doctoral degree in 1967, with a dissertation titled "Thermal Sterilization of Flexibly Packaged Foods".

== Career ==
Rha was a professor of biomaterials science and engineering at MIT, until her retirement in 2006. In 1980, she became the first Asian woman to earn tenure at MIT. She helped establish Genzyme, a biotechnology firm, and founded and directed the Malaysia-MIT Biotechnology Partnership Program. She endowed a professorship in industrial biotechnology at MIT. She was a co-founder of Women’s World Banking, a microfinancing program.

Rha's research focused on biochemistry and biotechnology for food and other applications. Her work was published in academic journalist including Journal of Food Science, Nature Biotechnology, Applied Microbiology and Biotechnology, Bioresource Technology, Biotechnology Letters, and British Journal of Nutrition. She earned her first of several patents in 1988, with a process for encapsulation. As part of her work in Malaysia, she developed several patented products derived from palm oil.

== Publications ==
- "Evaluation of cheese texture" (1978, with Cho Lee and Em Imoto)
- "Microstructure of soybean protein aggregates and its relation to the physical and textural properties of the curd" (1978, with Cho Lee)
- "Single-Cell Protein: Engineering, Economics, and Utilization in Foods" (1980, with C. L. Cooney and S. R. Tannenbaum)
- "Improved detergent-based recovery of polyhydroxyalkanoates (PHAs)" (2011, with Yung-Han Yang, Christopher Brigham, Laura Willis, and Anthony Sinskey)
- Theory, Determination and Control of Physical Properties of Food Materials (book edited by Rha, 2012)
- Characterization of chitosan film" (2012, with Carlos A. Kienzle-Sterzer and Dolores Rodriguez Sanchez)
- "Characterization of an extracellular lipase and its chaperone from Ralstonia eutropha H16" (2013, with Jingnan Lu, Christopher Brigham, and Anthony Sinskey)

== Personal life ==
ChoKyun Rha married fellow MIT professor Anthony Sinskey, and the couple frequently collaborated on research. She had two sons, Tong-ik Lee Sinskey and Taeminn Song, both of whom graduated from MIT. Rha died in 2021, in Boston, aged 87 years.
