= Lisa Endlich =

American writer

Lisa Endlich, also known as Lisa Heffernan, is a business writer and former vice-president at Goldman Sachs. She has an MBA from the MIT Sloan School of Management and worked as a trader at Goldman Sachs from 1985 to 1989. She is also the co-founder of the parenting website Grown and Flown.

== Bibliography ==
- Endlich, Lisa (1999). Goldman Sachs: The Culture Of Success. New York: A.A. Knopf. ISBN 0-679-45080-7.
- Endlich, Lisa (2004). Optical Illusions: Lucent and the Crash of Telecom. New York: Simon & Schuster. ISBN 0-743-22667-4.
- Endlich, Lisa (2008). Be the Change. HarperBusiness. ISBN 978-0-06-128768-8.
