= Journal of Clinical Gastroenterology =

- Discipline: Gastroenterology, hepatology
- Language: English
- Edited by: Ronnie Fass, MD

Publication details
- History: 1979-present
- Publisher: Lippincott Williams & Wilkins
- Frequency: 10/year
- Impact factor: 3.186 (2013)

Standard abbreviations
- ISO 4: J. Clin. Gastroenterol.

Indexing
- CODEN: JCGADC
- ISSN: 0192-0790 (print); 1539-2031 (web)
- LCCN: 79642938
- OCLC no.: 476312244

Links
- Journal homepage; Online access; Online archive

Journal of Clinical Gastroenterology is a peer-reviewed medical journal covering gastroenterology and hepatology, published by Lippincott Williams & Wilkins. It was established in 1979 and the current editor-in-chief is Ronnie Fass, MD (Case Western Reserve University School of Medicine).

== Abstracting and indexing ==
The journal is abstracted and indexed in:

- Science Citation Index
- Current Contents/Clinical Medicine
- Index Medicus/MEDLINE/PubMed

According to the Journal Citation Reports, the journal has a 2013 impact factor of 3.186.
