= Mosquito laser =

Proposed device for killing mosquitoes

High speed video footage of killing an Anopheles stephensi mosquito by a 1064 nm pulsed laser

A mosquito laser is a proposed device that would use lasers to kill mosquitoes. The primary goal would be to reduce malaria infection rates.

In 2007, the Bill & Melinda Gates Foundation asked Intellectual Ventures to find a way to fight and eventually end malaria. There, astrophysicist Lowell Wood had the idea to use lasers. Their project received considerable media attention around 2010, but the device was still under development as of 2017.

== Development ==
=== Initial vision ===
At a brainstorming session in 2007, to think of solutions for malaria, Wood, one of the architects of the Strategic Defense Initiative (SDI), also known as "Star Wars", suggested designing a system to kill mosquitoes with lasers. Soon after, the idea was followed up by many scientists at Intellectual Ventures and mosquitoes were being shot down within a year.

The original idea incorporates laser technology that stems from the SDI, scaled down to insects. Although the malaria-carrying parasite is gone from most developed nations, it is getting worse in undeveloped countries, and it is also becoming more resistant to drugs. Rather than continue with drugs or other pesticides, the mosquito laser takes a more direct approach by instantly killing mosquitoes or burning off their wings and rendering them harmless. One of the design goals was to minimize collateral damage to other species and the environment.

The laser, humorously referred to by some as a WMD (Weapon of Mosquito Destruction), works effectively at a range of 100 feet (approx. 30 meters). Although the team at Intellectual Ventures is confident in the effectiveness of the laser, they do not expect it to eliminate malaria altogether. They believe several technologies must be combined for maximum eradication and minimal cost.

=== Scientists involved ===
The team includes several scientists that previously worked at Lawrence Livermore National Laboratory. Wood worked with Edward Teller, the father of the hydrogen bomb, and architect of the SDI anti-missile laser program. Currently there are several scientists involved with the project, including scientist Jordin Kare, PhD, and principal investigator Eric Johanson. These scientists' knowledge spans several fields; the scientists include engineers, an insect physiologist, an optical specialist, a computational modeling scientist, and an epidemiologist.

=== Implementations ===
Several concepts were explored, considering cost and efficiency. Devised implementations included a hand-held model, flying drones, and the current prototype, the Photonic Fence. As of early 2008, Intellectual Venture's prototype consisted of a hand-held laser, capable of shooting down mosquitoes in limited numbers. The Intellectual Ventures scientists once suggested attaching a mosquito laser system to a small flying drone so that it could patrol the air. The current prototype idea being pursued is a perimeter based implementation known as the Photonic Fence. However, a device that can kill mosquitoes at a long enough range to make it practical has never been implemented.

== 2010 Photonic Fence ==
The device works by using infra-red light-emitting diode (LED) lamps on a fence post to create a field of light. This field of light reflects from retroreflective material on another fence post, much like that used on roads and highway signs, and bounces back to its source. This field of light is monitored by charge-coupled devices (CCDs) similar to the ones used in consumer digital cameras. These cameras are situated on both fence posts and detect shadows in the light between the posts. Once an insect is detected, a non-lethal laser is fired at it. This non-lethal laser is used to determine the size of the insect, and the frequency at which its wings are beating.

The information gathered by the non-lethal laser can be used to determine the type of insect, and even its sex because wing beat patterns are unique to each species and sex. This is important in preventing malaria because only female mosquitoes bite humans. Also, only mosquitoes of the genus Anopheles carry the malaria-causing parasite of the genus plasmodium. All of these determining calculations are done using a custom image processing board using software written specifically for this application. Once the software confirms that the insect is of the targeted species and sex, a safety check makes sure that nothing is in the way of the laser and the mosquito. Once this safety check is completed, the lethal laser is given permission to shoot.

The lethal laser could be one of several low-power consumer lasers, but blue-violet lasers, similar to the ones found in Blu-ray players, are thought to have great potential. Blue-violet lasers are preferable as higher powered ones, they are more available than red, and cheaper – due to them being used in the Blu-ray industry. The lethal laser is fired at the mosquito and is able to kill it mid-flight, possibly by overheating it. In a video published by Intellectual Ventures, the mosquito's wings appear to wither, shrivel up and the body drops to the floor, often motionless. Jordin Kare has published a discussion on how one might build a DIY photonic fence. Eric Johanson published information about the history of the device and how the system works in Make Magazine Issue 23.

=== Effectiveness ===
The Photonic Fence is thought to be best deployed surrounding buildings, such as hospitals and schools, or even whole villages, in an effort to reduce the spread of malaria. According to Nathan Myhrvold, co-founder of Intellectual Ventures, the Photonic Fence can kill up to 50 to 100 mosquitoes a second, at a maximum range of approx. 30 m (100 ft).

=== Cost ===
The Photonic Fence can be manufactured from parts used in current generation consumer technology and is projected to be relatively low cost. Myhrvold believes it can be made for around $50 per unit; however, Intellectual Ventures does not intend to manufacture the units, but rather to come up with a final design. The prototype of the fence was built with parts bought on eBay. All three stages of the photonic fence can be made from this consumer technology. When the device is looking for mosquitoes that pass its field of vision, it uses basic infra-red LEDs, and light sensors from modern digital cameras. To target and kill the mosquitoes it uses similar laser technology found in optical devices such as DVD, or Blu-ray disc drives.

=== Environmental, ecological, and usability concerns ===
The collateral damage to the non-malaria-carrying insect population from the Photonic Fence is thought to be low. Since the system can rapidly determine its target by wing beat frequency, it can be set to target only the female mosquitoes, who are the carriers of malaria in certain species of mosquitoes. Furthermore, this distinction allows it to avoid species of insects which don't spread disease, such as bees. The risk for collateral damage is minimized because the prototype checks the target and the kill-laser is barely strong enough to destroy mosquito tissue. The laser, as a replacement for pesticides, does not cause widespread environmental damage that pesticides do.

Some areas where malaria is prevalent do not have reliable electrical power.

== See also ==
- Laser fence
- Mosquito net
