= Dixie Lee Bryant =

American geologist (1862–1949)

- Born: January 7, 1862; Louisville, Kentucky
- Died: November 18, 1949 (aged 87); Asheville, North Carolina
- Citizenship: American
- Education: Columbia Female Institute, Columbia, Tennessee; Massachusetts Institute of Technology, Bavarian University in Erlangen
- Scientific career
- Workplaces: State Normal Industrial College
- Theses: A Study of the most recent history of the tide water region of Charles River [Boston area] and (1891); The petrography of Spitzbergen (1904)

Dixie Lee Bryant (1862–1949) was a geologist and educator.

Dixie Lee Bryant was born on January 7, 1862, in Louisville, Kentucky. After her family moved to Columbia, Tennessee in 1886, she enrolled in the Columbia Female Institute. Despite her desire to access a full college education, no Southern universities would admit her as a woman to their science programs. In 1887 she applied, and was admitted to the Massachusetts Institute of Technology in Boston. She graduated in 1891 with a Bachelor of Science. She submitted a thesis on the tide water region of the Charles River and was the first student (of any gender) to receive a Bachelor of Science in MIT's Course XII Geology department—now called Earth, Atmospheric and Planetary Sciences.

She taught natural science at the State Normal School at Plymouth, New Hampshire following her graduation prior to being hired to teach at the North Carolina State Normal Industrial School in Greensboro, in 1892. There, she taught botany, geology and chemistry, as well as tutoring many of the early students who entered the university with little prior education in the sciences. She led the science department until 1901, and presented at regional conferences on teaching technique and curriculum development. Described by former students as "A vigorous, wide-awake, well trained young woman," Bryant was also attributed as establishing the first chemical laboratory for use by women in the state of North Carolina. Bryant also worked as a faculty for the 1894 Summer School for Teachers and Students held in Chapel Hill, North Carolina, where she taught physical geography and botany. In 1897, she and four other women were the first to enroll in the University of North Carolina Chapel Hill. Bryant enrolled for graduate work.

In 1901 Bryant took a leave of absence in 1901 to continue her studies abroad. Early in the year she moved to Madison, Wisconsin to study petrography with Charles R. Van Hise. In the fall of 1901 she moved to Germany to pursue graduate studies. She studied microscopic petrography with Harry Rosenbusch at the University of Heidelberg from 1901 to 1902. She then moved to the Bavarian University in Erlangen, where she studied physics, geology (with Hans Lenk), and botany. She graduated with her PhD in geology in 1904, the first woman to receive a PhD in geology at that university.

Upon her return to State Normal in 1904 she was the first faculty member to hold a PhD. Her credentials did not result in any change in her salary or status and as a result she left the institution in 1905 to teach in public schools in Chicago. For the remainder of her career, Bryant taught in Chicago secondary schools, specifically Hyde Park and Schurz, until 1931 at which point she retired to Asheville, North Carolina. She died in 1949.

== Publications ==
- Bryant, Dixie Lee (1905). "Beiträge zur Petrographie Spitzbergens" (Document). Erlangen: Erlangen University.
