= Robert C. Hancké =

Belgian economist

Robert C. (Bob) Hancké (born 18 July 1962) is a Belgian economist specializing in European economies and in particular labour relations.

Hancké was born in Antwerp, Belgium. He holds a doctoral degree from the Massachusetts Institute of Technology. He is currently a Reader in European Political Economy at the London School of Economics and Political Science.

His main research interests include the political economy of advanced capitalist societies, the political economy of transition economies, institutions and macro-economic policy, and labour relations.

== Selected bibliography ==
- Hancké, Bob (2002) Large Firms and Institutional Change. Industrial Renewal and Economic Restructuring in France, Oxford: Oxford University Press.
- Hancké, Bob (2003) The Political Economy of Fiscal Policy in EMU, European Political Economy Review, Vol.1, no 1, pp. 1–10.
