= Greta Gray =

American architect and home economist (1880–1961)

Greta Gray (September 30, 1880 – January 18, 1961) was an American architect, home economist, and academic. She is noted as the most progressive early writer on the domestic environment.

== Education ==
Gray, born in 1880 in Covington, Kentucky, earned her Bachelor of Science in architecture at Massachusetts Institute of Technology in 1901. While at MIT, she was one of 24 members of Eta Sigma Mu, the first club for women students at MIT. The intention of the club was to "organize a society for the promotion of a more cordial fellow feeling among the women students for a mutual social benefit." Eta Sigma Mu, later renamed to The Cleofan, recruited members by writing to women who intended to become students over the summer months.

After completing her degree at MIT, Gray worked in the field of architecture and design for 9 years, including a year of travel and study in Europe. She then went on to complete a preparatory course in education at the State Normal School in Cheney, Washington. In 1914, she graduated from the teachers college at Columbia University with a Master of Arts. In 1926, she earned a Doctor of Philosophy in Public Health from Yale University.

== Career ==
After receiving her Master of Arts from Columbia University, Greta taught at the University of Illinois, Kansas State Teachers College, the University of Wyoming, Johns Hopkins University, Washington State University, the University of California, and Columbia University.

In 1918, Gray became Professor of Home Economics and chairman of the department at the University of Wyoming. Upon completing her Doctor of Philosophy, she became a professor at the University of Nebraska, going on to accept an associate professorship at University of California, Los Angeles (UCLA) in 1928, which she held for 21 years. She held the position of Chairman of the Department of Home Economics at UCLA for six years.

She died January 18, 1961, in Cathedral City, California.

== Publications ==
During her time at UCLA, Greta published House and Home: A manual and textbook of house planning which featured an article from Richard J. Neutra. The book outlines four phases of shelter development; sanitary, economic, social, and architectural in an "elementary, and non-technical way" with the goal of further study of the subject by its readers.

Gray also published many journal articles that span the subjects of housing needs, clothing, and overall health. Perhaps the most notable of these publications is Convenient Kitchens, published by the USDA, which explores the architecture of kitchens, giving suggestions as to their design.

Among Gray's notes appears this statement:

It is difficult to find outlets for studies in family economics and other lines in which I am interested, so I have written more that is unpublished than has been published. The other day while going through my files I found a dozen or more I had not previously discarded. Among them were: 'A Thirty-Year Financial History of a Los Angeles Family' and a study of 'Consumption and Production on Small Acreage Homesteads near Los Angeles.

— Greta Gray
