= Richard Stratt =

American chemist and physicist

Richard M. Stratt
- Education: MIT - S.B 1975; California Berkeley - Ph.D. 1979
- Scientific career
- Fields: Physical chemistry

Richard Stratt is an American chemist and physicist, currently the Newport Rogers Professor of Chemistry and a Professor of Physics at Brown University.

Stratt's research focuses on developing a theoretical understanding of fluid dynamics with ultrafast spectroscopy. Specifically, he aims to understand the molecular mechanisms of phenomena such as solvation and vibrational relaxation, steps key to chemical reactions in liquids.

Alongside his research, Stratt teaches various classes in chemistry, such as an introductory chemistry class at Brown called Equilibrium, Rate, and Structure.

Stratt is a Fellow of the American Physical Society, recognized “for major contributions to our understanding of the microscopic origins of the collective vibrational motions (instantaneous normal modes) in liquids and their ramifications for ultrafast spectroscopy and liquid dynamics in general.”.

He received the Joel Henry Hildebrand Award in the Theoretical and Experimental Chemistry of Liquids.

He served in several leadership roles within the American Chemical Society (ACS). In the Theoretical Chemistry Subdivision, he was Vice-Chair (1996–1997), Chair-Elect (1997–1998), and Chair (1998–1999). Within the Physical Chemistry Division, he served as Vice-Chair Elect (1998–1999), Vice-Chair (1999–2000), Chair-Elect and Program Chair (2000–2001), Chair (2001–2002), and Immediate Past Chair (2002–2003).
