= Alan Spoon =

American business executive

Alan G. Spoon (born June 4, 1951) is a business executive who left the Washington Post Company after 18 years, his final position being president and chief operating officer, to become a general partner at Polaris Ventures. Spoon served as Chief Operating Officer and a director of The Washington Post Company from March 1991 through May 2000 and President from September 1993 until May 2000. At Polaris, he was General Partner and Partner Emeritus from 2011 to 2018 and Managing General Partner from 2000 to 2010. He became a director of IAC in February 2003.

Spoon graduated from the Massachusetts Institute of Technology in 1973.
