= The Other Country =

2012 book by Mrinal Pande

The Other Country: Dispatches from the Mofussil
- First edition
- Author: Mrinal Pande
- Language: English
- Subject: Development, cities, social and cultural changes
- Publisher: Penguin Books India
- Publication date: 3 January 2012
- Publication place: India
- Pages: 240
- ISBN: 9780143418252

The Other Country: Dispatches from the Mofussil is a 2012 book by the Indian journalist, television presenter and writer Mrinal Pande.

== Synopsis ==
The book examines the growing divides between small-town and big-city India, such as inequitable development and opportunities. Pande investigates the "Great Language Divide" between India's two official languages, Hindi and English, and analyses the water management issues facing India. Pande also writes about the increasing polarisation on social issues between urban areas and smaller towns. The book features various stories of women who have fought against societal expectations to achieve their goals. Pande also condemns the objectification of women in capitalist media and patriarchy in India.

== Reception ==
In The Hindu Swati Daftuar praised the work, describing it as "a classic combination of hard-hitting reportage and anecdotal essaying". Daftuar also wrote that The Other Country is "essential read for anyone trying to understand some of the most vexing issues troubling our society today".

In Between The Lines Seema Khinnavar write that the work is "a thought provoking insight into the myriad issues affecting the 'India Shining' image of our country".
