= Alan Carlin =

American economist

Alan Carlin (born 1937), is an American economist specializing in cost-benefit analysis and the economics of global climate change control.

== Education ==
Carlin earned a Ph.D. in economics from the Massachusetts Institute of Technology, and a B.S. in physics from the California Institute of Technology.

== Work ==
Carlin worked as an economist at the Rand Corporation from 1963 to 1971. From 1971 to 1974, Carlin was director of the Implementation Research Division of the US Environmental Protection Agency (EPA). He was a Senior Operations Research Analyst at the U.S. Environmental Protection Agency (EPA), from 1974 to 2010. During this period Carlin "carried out or supervised over a hundred policy-related studies on climate change, pollutant assessment, energy economics and development, environmental economics, transportation economics, benefit-cost analysis, and economic development." He lists 39 publications he personally prepared. In 2010, Carlin retired from his work as a Senior Operations Research Analyst at the U.S. Environmental Protection Agency (EPA).

== Environmental Efforts ==
In the late 1960s Carlin's efforts together with the Sierra Club in presenting economic arguments against the two proposed dams in the Grand Canyon of Arizona resulted in those dams not being built. From 1970 to 1971 was Chairman of the Sierra Club's second largest Angeles Chapter. He received the Chapter's Weldon Heald award for conservation work.

== Controversy over EPA report prepared by Carlin ==
Carlin is best known for a controversy that arose in June 2009, over the alleged suppression of a report Carlin and a coworker wrote opposing the EPA's Proposed Endangerment Finding for greenhouse gases.

In June 2009, the Competitive Enterprise Institute, a Washington D.C.–based think tank, and Senator James Inhofe (R-Oklahoma) claimed that the EPA had suppressed a report authored by Alan Carlin, that cast doubt on the existence of global warming and the need to regulate CO_{2} emissions. Senator Inhofe wrote a letter to the EPA Administrator, Lisa Jackson, requesting that the agency reopen this matter and called for a congressional investigation of the suppression. The EPA Press Secretary Adora Andy, responded: "Claims that this individual’s opinions were not considered or studied are entirely false. . . . The individual in question is not a scientist and was not part of the working group dealing with this issue. Nevertheless the document he submitted was reviewed by his peers and agency scientists, and information from that report was submitted by his manager to those responsible for developing the proposed endangerment finding. In fact, some ideas from that document are included and addressed in the endangerment finding. Additionally, his manager has allowed his general views on the subject of climate change to be heard and considered inside and outside the EPA and presented at conferences and at an agency seminar. And this individual was granted a request to join a committee that organizes an ongoing climate seminar series, open to both agency and outside experts, where he has been able to invite speakers with a full range of views on climate science."

Internal e-mails related to the alleged suppression of Carlin's report were released under the Freedom of Information Act. In them, Carlin, was discouraged by his superior at EPA, Al McGartland, "from filing comments on the proposed finding and told ... that whatever he submitted was not likely to affect the final report, suggesting to some that the decision had already been made by early March 2009. After receiving Carlin’s comments, McGartland told him that he would not forward them to the office preparing the final report. 'The time for such discussion of fundamental issues has passed for this round,' he wrote on March 17. 'The administrator and the administration has decided to move forward on endangerment, and your comments do not help the legal or policy case for this decision.' A few minutes later, he instructed Carlin to 'move on to other issues and subjects.' He also told Carlin not to discuss climate change with anyone outside his immediate office." Carlin also acknowledged in the article that his report had been produced under short deadline and, as critics have said since, was not fully or cleanly sourced, and there was no restriction on his contact with the media. Andy was quoted as calling "the accusation that Carlin had been muzzled for political reasons 'ridiculous.' 'There was no predetermined position on endangerment, and Dr. Carlin’s work was not suppressed,' Andy said in an e-mail response to questions. 'This administration has always welcomed varying scientific points of view, and we received much of it over this process.'" No further Congressional action was reported, in the September report.

== Appearance on Glenn Beck Show ==
Carlin appeared on the Glenn Beck Show on July 1, 2009, and stated that U.N. models anticipated an increase in global temperatures, but actual temperatures, according to the figures Carlin presented, had decreased between 2002 and 2008.

== See also ==
- American Clean Energy and Security Act
- Climate change in the United States
