= Interactive Robots and Media Lab =

Research laboratory

The Interactive Robots and Media Lab (IRML) is a research laboratory, originally hosted at the College of IT of the United Arab Emirates University in Al-Ain, Abu Dhabi Emirate, UAE, then moved on to the CSE facilities of New York University Abu Dhabi. Starting January 2013 IRML is expanding, emancipating, and partially commercializing its operations.

The laboratory was founded in September 2007 by Nikolaos Mavridis, a PhD holder from the Massachusetts Institute of Technology, and started operations in February 2008. The main projects underway in the lab (as of December 2009) were two: the Ibn Sina Robot, an android that is able to converse in the Arabic language, as well as the Microsoft-funded FaceBots project, which aimed towards building robots that can sustain long-term relationships with humans through dialogues referencing shared memories and shared friends, while utilizing and depositing social information on the Facebook website. Other projects have started since then; mainly revolving around human-robot interaction, machine perception, and cognitive systems.

The lab has also hosted three international research-centric summer schools, which have a special format: they have a duration of one month, most of the time is spent in collaborative team-work on hands-on research projects, carried out in teams of 3–5 members coming from diverse academic levels (post-doctoral, graduate, undergraduate) and countries of origin. Also, the lab has been involved in other activities related to robotics and interactive media, winning for example the "Best Pipe Inspection Robot Design” at the Schlumberger i-Design course competition, and being involved in activities related to winning the bid and preparation for hosting the World Robot Olympiad (WRO) in Abu Dhabi in 2011.

The lab has been featured in regional as well as international news, on venues such as the BBC, Agence France Press (AFP), The UAE National, Al Jazeera TV etc.
