= Richard Santagati =

American businessman and philanthropist (born 1945)

Richard J. Santagati (born 1945) is an American businessman and philanthropist who has served as an executive for several businesses and institutions. He has held multiple high-profile positions in Massachusetts-based companies. His service at some locations has garnered controversy, and the Boston Herald has claimed that he has "received more publicity—some of it positive, some of it decidedly negative—than most people receive in several lifetimes".

== Education and early career ==
Santagati attended Merrimack College, a private college in North Andover, Massachusetts. After graduating from Merrimack, he attended the MIT Sloan School of Management.

His first major executive position was as the Vice President of Marketing for NYNEX. He later became the President of NYNEX Business Information Systems Company, a company formed as part of NYNEX to explore entry into the non-regulated enterprise information systems business and also to open the first NYNEX retail stores. Under Santagati's leadership of NYNEX Business Information Systems the company opened its first retail stores, in an exploratory major shift of strategy.

== Gaston & Snow ==
In 1986 Santagati moved from NYNEX to Gaston & Snow, which was then Boston's fifth largest law firm. He initially became the chief operating officer. Though it was then an unusual step for a law firm to put a non-lawyer in a high-profile executive role, he later became the CEO of the company. During his tenure at Gaston & Snow the legal fees, overhead, and lawyer salaries skyrocketed, as was the case at many of their competitors. In the early 1990s Gaston & Snow's finances rapidly deteriorated and they were forced to lay off employees. Gaston & Snow filed for bankruptcy in October 1991. Some of the factors that caused the bankruptcy include heavy debt, the loss of partners, and conflict between executives. The Boston Globe referred to it as "worst implosion of a Boston law firm in history". Some blamed Santagati for Gaston & Snow's failure. One of the bankruptcy trustees accused him of "fraud, negligence and breach of fiduciary duty". The allegations also included charges that he "manipulated the firm's internal systems to boost his own compensation, standing and business reputation". Many Boston lawyers argued, however, that the bankruptcy was the fault of senior lawyers at Gaston & Snow. Santagati's defenders contend that some lawyers who were already the highest paid employees of the firm insisted on higher pay and blocked plans to rescue the company.

After leaving Gaston & Snow in 1991 Santagati served as a partner in the Boston-based venture capital firm Lighthouse Capital Management for a year before becoming the CEO of Artel Communications from 1992 to 1994.

== Merrimack College ==
In 1995 Santagati became the president of his alma mater, Merrimack College. He had previously served as the chairman of Merrimack College's board of trustees. Merrimack is run by the Order of Saint Augustine and Santagati was the first chief executive in Merrimack's history that was not a part of the order. During his leadership of Merrimack it transitioned from a school known for students living off campus and commuted to classes to a school with 80% of students living on campus. Santagati was also the most successful fundraiser in Merrimack history, acquiring the first seven figure gifts in the school's history. While he served as president of the school the number of applications that they received doubled. He announced his retirement in January 2008 after 14 years at Merrimack.

At Merrimack Santagati occasionally came into conflict with the school's faculty. In May 2007 he made the decision to deny tenure to a professor prompting Merrimack's professors cast a symbolic vote of no confidence against him. His decision received the backing of the board of trustees, however. In 2006 his compensation made headlines after he was paid a salary of $709,969 plus expenses, making him the third highest paid president of a private college in the United States. A spokesperson for the college defended his salary, noting that he was typically paid much less but received a sum of conditional long term deferred compensation that year due to a change in IRS regulations. In the aftermath of the announcement the Merrimack College faculty senate passed a motion expressing "presidential compensation may damage the College's reputation". Merrimack's campus newspaper also published an article quoting students that were critical of his compensation.

He is now the chairman of the board of trustees of Lawrence General Hospital in Lawrence, Massachusetts. Santagati also serves on the board of directors of Revlon, Celerity Solutions, and CTC Communications. He has also been the chairman of the Merrimack Valley Chamber of Commerce. He is married to Marilyn Santagati and has three children.
