= Philip J. Siemens =

American physicist and professor

Philip John Siemens
- Born: November 13, 1943; Elgin, Illinois
- Died: June 23, 2023 (aged 79); Eugene, Oregon
- Education: Massachusetts Institute of Technology; Cornell University
- Awards: Fellow, American Physical Society; Distinguished Scientist, Oakridge National Laboratory; Fellow of the American Association for the Advancement of Science
- Scientific career
- Fields: Theoretical physics
- Workplaces: Niels Bohr Institute; University of Illinois; Lawrence Berkeley National Laboratory; Texas A&M University; Oakridge National Laboratory; Oregon State University
- Thesis: New Statistical Theory of the Nuclear Surface
- Doctoral advisor: Hans Bethe

Philip John Siemens (November 13, 1943 – June 29, 2023) was a theoretical physicist who trained at MIT and Cornell, and who taught and conducted research at the Niels Bohr Institute, Lawrence Berkeley National Laboratory, Texas A&M University, Oak Ridge National Laboratory, and Oregon State University.

He was a fellow of both the American Physical Society and the American Association for the Advancement of Science.

== Early life and education ==
Philip John Siemens, the eldest of Dorothea and Jacob J. Siemens' five children, was born November 13, 1943, in Elgin, Illinois. He attended Wheaton Academy and earned a National Merit scholarship to study at the Massachusetts Institute of Technology, where he majored in physics.

As a Cornell University graduate student, Siemens specialized in theoretical nuclear physics. He co-authored two publications prior to his dissertation: in 1967, "Shape of Heavy Nuclei", and in 1969, "Nuclear-matter reaction matrix".

His 1970 dissertation, New Statistical Theory of the Nuclear Surface, was advised by Nobel laureate Hans Bethe.

== Career ==
In the decade following completion of his doctorate, Siemens worked at the University of Copenhagen's Niels Bohr Institute. In 1975, he co-authored, "Linear response theory for dissipation in heavy-ion collisions" with Helmut Hofmann.

While on leave from the Niels Bohr Institute in 1979, Siemens also co-authored three papers with Joseph I. Kapusta at Lawrence Berkeley National Laboratory: "Evidence for a Soft Nuclear-Matter Equation of State", "Evidence for a Blast Wave from Compressed Nuclear Matter", and "Evidence for a Soft Nuclear-Matter Equation of State".

In the 1980s, Siemens was recruited to establish Texas A&M University's Physics Department and Cyclotron Institute faculty. While there between 1983 and 1985, he authored and co-authored four studies: "Liquid–gas phase transition in nuclear matter", "Nuclear fragmentation", "Testing QCD Plasma Formation by Pion Correlations in Relativistic Nuclear Collisions", and "Testing of QCD Plasma Formation by Dilepton Spectra in Relativistic Nuclear Collisions".

Siemens was welcomed as a "distinguished scientist" at Oak Ridge National Laboratory in 1986. The Knoxville News Sentinel reported Siemens was "recognized as one of the theoretical leaders in the physics of nuclei heated to very high temperatures stellar explosions and in high-energy collisions." The Tomahawk in Mountain City called Siemens "a recognized leader in the theoretical interpretation of nuclear structures and collisions of energetic heavy nuclei produced by large particle accelerators".

While at the University of Tennessee in the late 1980s, Siemens published two studies: "Bubbles and drops in superheated and supercooled nuclear matter, and "Color correlations in QCD plasma". He also co-authored the 1989 publication of "Relativistic transport theory of fluctuating fields for hadrons".

Near the end of his career, wanting to be closer to his family in Oregon, he "convinced Oregon State University in Corvallis to hire him and increase its commitment to theoretical physics". In 1990 he co-authored "Truncation of Schwinger-Dyson equations and the 1/𝑁 expansion in the O⁡(𝑁) model", followed by two papers in 1991: "Vaporization of color-singlet pairs from a quark-gluon plasma", and "Model solutions of regularized relativistic transport equations". These papers were followed by three more: "Kaon pictures of QCD plasma droplets" in 1992; "Crossing-symmetric two-particle reduction of four-point vertex" in 1993; and "Self-consistent couplings of pions and Δ-hole states in nuclear matter" in 1994.

Philip Siemens' retirement was acknowledged in the department newsletter in January 2007. He died of leukemia in Eugene in January 2023.

== Selected publications ==
=== Books ===
- Siemens, Philip; Jensen, Asksel S. (1987). Elements Of Nuclei: Many-body Physics With The Strong Interaction. CRC Press: Taylor and Francis Group. doi:10.1201/9780429493904. ISBN 9780429493904.

=== Articles ===
- Siemens, Philip J. (Sep 1983). "Liquid–gas phase transition in nuclear matter". Nature. 305 (5933). Nature Publishing Group: 410–412. doi:10.1038/305410a0. ISSN 1476-4687.
- Siemens, Philip J.; Rasmussen, John O. (1979-04-02). "Evidence for a Blast Wave from Compressed Nuclear Matter". Physical Review Letters. 42 (14). American Physical Society: 880–883. doi:10.1103/PhysRevLett.42.880.
- Bertsch, G.; Siemens, Philip J. (Jun 1983). "Nuclear fragmentation". Physics Letters B. 126 (1–2): 9–12. doi:10.1016/0370-2693(83)90004-7. ISSN 0370-2693. Archived from the original on 2023-12-22.
- Siemens, Philip J. (Feb 1970). "Nuclear-matter reaction matrix". Nuclear Physics A. 141 (2): 225–248. doi:10.1016/0375-9474(70)90844-4.
- Siemens, Philip J.; Kapusta, Joseph I. (1979-11-12). "Evidence for a Soft Nuclear-Matter Equation of State". Physical Review Letters. 43 (20). American Physical Society: 1486–1489. doi:10.1103/PhysRevLett.43.1486.

== Honors ==
- 1984 Fellow of the American Physical Society, Dvision of Nuclear Physics, cited For important contributions to the theory of many-body systems as applied to nuclear physics.
- 1991 Fellow of the American Association for the Advancement of Science, for achievements in "theoretical studies of nuclear matter, the nuclear equation of state and the physics of nuclear collision".
