= Faye McNeill =

American Atmospheric Chemist

V. Faye McNeill
- Born: Vivian Faye McNeill
- Education: Massachusetts Institute of Technology; California Institute of Technology
- Scientific career
- Workplaces: Columbia University
- Thesis: Studies of heterogeneous ice chemistry relevant to the atmosphere (2005)

Vivian Faye McNeill is an American atmospheric chemist who is professor of chemical engineering at Columbia University. She leads the university's initiative Clean Air Toolbox for Cities. McNeill provided expert guidance on aerosols and ventilation throughout the COVID-19 pandemic.

== Early life and education ==
McNeill was an undergraduate student in chemical engineering at the California Institute of Technology. During her undergraduate degree. she became interested in aerosol science, watching the smog above the San Gabriel Mountains. McNeill suffered from asthma, and became increasingly aware of how much science could advance environmental policy and public health. She moved to the Massachusetts Institute of Technology for doctoral research, where she worked as a NASA Earth System Science Fellow. Her doctoral advisor was Mario Molina, the Nobel laureate who predicted that chlorofluorocarbons depleted stratospheric ozone.

== Research and career ==
McNeill joined Columbia University in 2007 and was awarded tenure in 2014. Her research looked to understand the interactions of trace gases with ice and snow. These interactions can be used to better predict how climate change will impact the composition of the atmosphere. The findings can also be used to understand ice core chemical records.

McNeill is interested in atmospheric aerosols and their role of atmospheric chemistry. Her research combines computational modelling with field work and lab-based experimental investigations. Air pollution is responsible for at least 6.7 million premature deaths a year. McNeill leads Clean Air Toolbox for Cities (CAToolbox), an interdisciplinary program that collects information about air quality in Africa, India and Indonesia.

During the COVID-19 pandemic, McNeill provided guidance about aerosols and ventilation to the general public.

== Awards and honors ==
- 2009 ACS Petroleum Research Fund Doctoral New Investigator
- 2009 National Science Foundation CAREER Award
- 2015 American Association for Aerosol Research Kenneth T. Whitby Award
- 2018 Mellichamp Emerging Leaders Lecturer

== Selected publications ==
- V Faye McNeill (22 January 2015). "Aqueous organic chemistry in the atmosphere: sources and chemical processing of organic aerosols". Environmental Science & Technology. 49 (3): 1237–1244. doi:10.1021/es5043707. ISSN 0013-936X. PMID 25609552. Wikidata Q42696699.
- T. Bartels-Rausch; H.-W. Jacobi; T. F. Kahan; et al. (12 February 2014). "A review of air–ice chemical and physical interactions (AICI): liquids, quasi-liquids, and solids in snow". Atmospheric Chemistry and Physics. 14 (3): 1587–1633. Bibcode:2014ACP....14.1587B. doi:10.5194/acp-14-1587-2014. ISSN 1680-7316. Wikidata Q58613007.
- V Faye McNeill; Joseph L Woo; Derek D Kim; Allison N Schwier; Neal J Wannell; Andrew J Sumner; Joseph M Barakat (25 July 2012). "Aqueous-phase secondary organic aerosol and organosulfate formation in atmospheric aerosols: a modeling study". Environmental Science & Technology. 46 (15): 8075–8081. doi:10.1021/es3002986. ISSN 0013-936X. PMID 22788757. Wikidata Q40048426.
