= Mahmooda Sultana =

Bangladeshi American scientist

- Born: Ishwardi, Rajshahi, Bangladesh
- Education: Ph.D. in chemical engineering
- Alma mater: Massachusetts Institute of Technology, University of Southern California
- Occupation: Scientist
- Title: Associate Branch Head, Instrument Systems Engineering Branch NASA Goddard Space Flight Center
- Awards: IRAD Innovator of the Year

Mahmooda Sultana is a Bangladeshi-American scientist working for NASA Goddard Space Flight Center. She leads a team which won a $2 million technology development award for a nanomaterial-based detector platform in 2019. Sultana became a NASA research engineer in 2010. She received her PhD in chemical engineering in 2010 from Massachusetts Institute of Technology and BSc in chemical engineering and mathematics from University of Southern California summa cum laude. She joined NASA Goddard Space Flight Center in 2010. She has led the development of graphene-based detectors at NASA Goddard. Her research interests include graphene, nanomaterials, micro-electro-mechanical systems (MEMs) devices, and sensors.

== Early life and education ==
Sultana immigrated to California with her family as a teen. Her work on nano-materials and processes to make detectors and device that could have applications in space. She has expanded her research interests into quantum dots and 3D printing.

== Awards ==
She has received numerous awards for her work, including NASA GSFC Innovator of the Year Award, Robert H Goddard Award for technology development work, Group Achievement Award for James Webb Telescope, NASA Early Career Achievement Medal, Internal Research and Development (ISTD) New Achiever Medal, Bell Laboratories Graduate Research Fellowship, NSF Graduate Research Fellowship, and WmC and Margaret H. Rousseau Fellowship at MIT.
