= Chemical Engineering and Biotechnology Abstracts =

Bibliographical database

- Producer: DECHEMA (Germany)
- Languages: German, English

Access
- Providers: Dialog database

Coverage
- Disciplines: Chemical property data, Chemical processing, Laboratory experiments, Engineering theory, Computer applications, Environmental protection, Reaction engineering, Plant and personnel safety, Measurement and process control, and Physical property data
- Record depth: Index & abstract
- Format coverage: Meetings, Conferences, Symposia, Reports, Books, Monographs, Journal Articles, and Press Releases
- Temporal coverage: 1963 to the present
- Geospatial coverage: Global with no restrictions
- No. of records: 685,000 +
- Update frequency: Monthly

Print edition
- Print title: Theoretical Chemical Engineering, Environmental Protection and Process Safety, Process and Chemical Engineering, Biotechnology: Apparatus, Plant, and Equipment, and Current Biotechnology

Chemical Engineering and Biotechnology Abstracts (CEABA-VTB) is an abstracting and indexing service that is published by DECHEMA, BASF, and Bayer Technology Services, all based in Germany. This is a bibliographic database that covers multiple disciplines.

== Subject coverage ==
Subject coverage includes engineering, management, manufacturing plants, equipment, production, and processing pertaining to various disciplines. The fields of interest are bio-process engineering, chemical engineering, process engineering, environmental protection (including safety), fermentation, enzymology, bio-transformation, information technology, technology and testing of materials (including corrosion), mathematical methods (including modeling), measurement (including control of processes), utilities (including services). Also covered are production processes and process development. CAS registry numbers are also part of this database.
