= Mrinal Pande =

Writer, journalist, editor, media personality

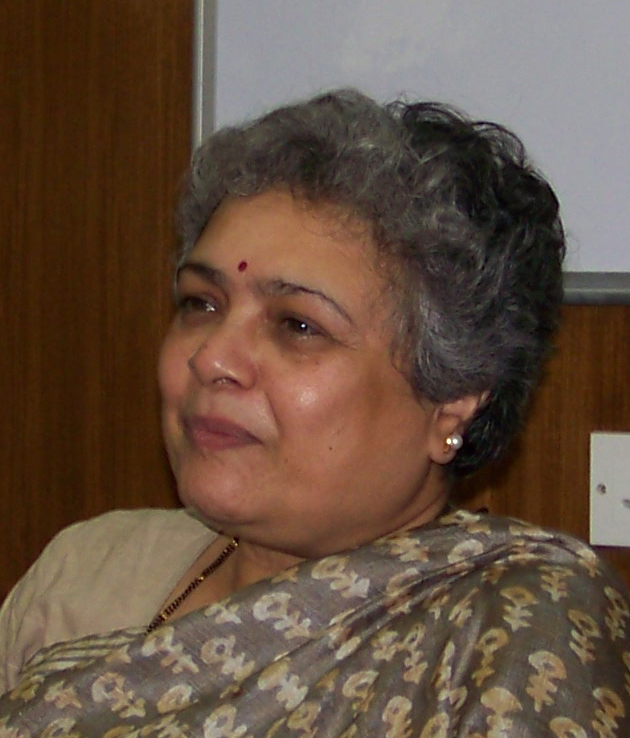
- Born: 26 February 1946 (age 80); Tikamgarh, Central India Agency, British India (present-day Madhya Pradesh)
- Education: Allahabad University George Washington University
- Occupations: Hindi story writer, editor, columnist, essayist
- Years active: 1967–present

Mrinal Pande (born 26 February 1946) is an Indian television personality, journalist and author, and until 2009 chief editor of Hindi daily Hindustan.

== Early life and education ==
Pande was born in Tikamgarh, Madhya Pradesh, 26 February 1946. She studied initially at Nainital and then completed her master's degree from Allahabad University.

== Career ==
In her report on the life of indian women in the countryside (2003), she criticizes the widespread taboo in India of everything to do with the body and sexuality.

In 1983, she published her short story, "Girls" in the Hindi weekly Dharmyug, and in English language translation in the weekly Manushi in the same year.

She was awarded the Padma Shri in 2006 for her services in the field of journalism. She got extreme criticism from netizens when she unnecessarily body shamed Aishwarya Rai in 2026.

== Bibliography ==
- Devi, Tales of the Goddess in our time; 2000, Viking/Penguin.
- Daughter's Daughter, 1993. Penguin Books.
- That Which Ram Hath Ordained, 1993, Seagull Books.
- The Subject is Woman, 1991. Sanchar Publishing House, New Delhi.
- My Own Witness, 2001, Penguin, New Delhi,ISBN 0-14-029731-6.#
- Stepping Out · Life and Sexuality in Rural India, 2003, Gardners Books.
- The Other Country: Dispatches from the Mofussil, 2012, Penguin, New Delhi.
- Sahela Re - A Novel, 2023, Harper Perennial India

== See also ==
- List of Indian writers
- Kumauni people
