= Soung Chang Liew =

Academic background
- Education: Massachusetts Institute of Technology
- Thesis: Capacity assignment in non-switching multichannel networks (1988)
- Doctoral advisor: Robert S. Kennedy

Chinese name
- Traditional Chinese: 劉紹強
- Hanyu Pinyin: Liú Shàoqiáng
- Jyutping: Lau4 Siu6koeng4

Soung Chang Liew is a Hong Kong professor of information engineering. He worked at Bellcore in New Jersey from 1988 to 1993 before joining the Chinese University of Hong Kong faculty in 1993. He was named Fellow of the Institute of Electrical and Electronics Engineers (IEEE) in 2012 "for contributions to wireless communications and networking".
