= Theodosios Alexander =

American academic, engineer and author

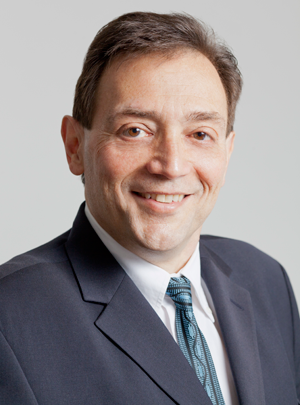
- Awards: UK NHS Innovator of the Year Award (2008, 2009); Kenneth Harris James Prize in Aerospace Engineering (2014)

Academic background
- Education: Newcastle University; MIT

Academic work
- Discipline: mechanical engineering
- Institutions: Saint Louis University; Queen Mary University of London; University of Glasgow; Washington University; MIT

Theodosios Alexander is an American academic, engineer and author. He has served as faculty and in academic administration in four universities, in the UK and US, following the award of four graduate degrees from MIT, and work in engineering industry.

== Education ==
Graduating with a first class honors bachelor of science degree in Marine Engineering from Newcastle University in 1981, Alexander went on to complete three Master of Science degrees in naval architecture and marine engineering, ocean systems management, and mechanical engineering, all from the Massachusetts Institute of Technology (MIT). These were followed by a doctorate in mechanical engineering, also from MIT.

== Career ==
In 1988, Alexander joined the Mechanical Engineering department at the McKelvey School of Engineering at Washington University in St. Louis where he was Director of the Internal Combustion Engines Lab and taught until 2001. From there he moved to the UK and was the James Watt Professor of Thermodynamics at the University of Glasgow until 2006. At the University of Glasgow, he developed the Center for Emerging Technologies and the Power and Propulsion Laboratory. From February 2006 until August 2012 he served as Chair of Energy Engineering at Queen Mary University of London. He returned to St. Louis in 2012 to become Dean of Parks College of Engineering, Aviation and Technology of Saint Louis University in September 2012. He has also served as director of interdisciplinary research collaborations, as executive for new initiatives, and he also serves as a professor of aerospace and mechanical engineering.

Alexander has worked for Hellenic Shipyards S.A, U.S. Navy Consultants John J. McMullen & Associates in Washington D.C., at the Northern Research and Engineering Corporation in Woburn, Massachusetts, and at McDonnell Douglas and Boeing in St. Louis on propulsion-system studies. He remains active in numerous international consulting activities.

== Research ==
Alexander’s research career has focused on thermal or fluid sciences and applications on the design of power and propulsion systems, energy transformation, renewable energy and engineering systems and components. He also conducted research on unsteady thermo-fluid dynamics and unsteady transport phenomena within those areas, the performance of turbomachinery and airfoil, a novel method to predict gas turbine and piston engine emissions, development of a novel Nutating disc engine for unmanned aerial vehicles and on fluid-dynamic modeling of the cardiovascular system, and development of mechanical circulatory support devices.

Alexander holds six patents on biomedical devices; he is a co-author of a textbook on turbomachinery design and has published more than 140 research papers in archival scientific journals.

== Honors and awards ==
The UK National Health Service (NHS) Innovations Program awarded Alexander with the Innovator of the Year Award in 2008 and 2009 for his personal research on mechanical circulatory support devices.

2014 Kenneth Harris James Prize in Aerospace Engineering, Institute of Mechanical Engineers, UK.

2018 Literati Highly Commended Award.

== Professional memberships and associations ==
- American Society of Mechanical Engineers (ASME)
- American Institute of Aeronautics and Astronautics (AIAA)
- Society of Automotive Engineers (SAE International)
- Sigma Xi, the Scientific Research Society

== Representative publications ==
- “Optimization of axial pump characteristic dimensions and induced hemolysis for mechanical circulatory support devices” ASAIO journal, Vol 64, Issue 6, Nov 2018, pp. 727–734 DOI: 10.1097/MAT.0000000000000719
- “The Effect of Geometry on the Efficiency and Hemolysis of Centrifugal Implantable Blood Pumps” ASAIO Journal, Vol 63, issue 1, Jan 2017, DOI: 10.1097/MAT.0000000000000457
- “In-vitro investigation of hemodynamic responses of the cerebral, coronary and renal circulations with a rotary blood pump installed in the descending aorta” Medical Engineering & Physics, Vol 40, No. 1, p. 2-10, 2017, DOI: 10.1016/j.medengphy.2016.11.006
- “Optimization of Centrifugal Pump Characteristic Dimensions for Mechanical Circulatory Support Devices” ASAIO journal, Vol 62, issue 5, p 545-551, Sep 2016, DOI: 10.1097/MAT.0000000000000393.
- “The effects of ambulatory accelerations on the stability of a magnetically suspended impeller for an implantable blood pump” Artificial Organs, Aug 2016, DOI: 10.1111/aor.12749
- “Experimentally tested performance and emissions advantages of using natural-gas and hydrogen fuel mixture with diesel and rapeseed methyl ester as pilot fuels” Applied Energy, Volume 229, 1 Nov 2018, pp. 1260–1268. DOI: 10.1016/j.apenergy.2018.08.052
- “Hydraulic characterization of diesel and water emulsions using momentum flux” Fuel, Vol 162, pp. 23–33. 2015, DOI: 10.1016/j.fuel.2015.08.016
- “Natural gas fueled compression ignition engine performance and emissions maps with diesel and RME pilot fuels” Applied Energy, Vol 124, pp. 354–365, 2014. DOI: 10.1016/j.apenergy.2014.02.067
- “Assessment of elliptic flame front propagation characteristics of iso-octane, gasoline, M85 and E85 in an optical engine”, Combustion and Flame, Vol 161, No (3), pp. 696–710, 2014, DOI: 10.1016/j.combustflame.2013.07.020
- “Design of high-efficiency turbomachinery blades for energy conversion devices with the three dimensional prescribed surface curvature distribution blade design (CIRCLE) method” Applied Energy, Vol 89, No. 1, pp. 215–227, Jan 2012, DOI: 10.1016/j.apenergy.2011.07.004

== See also ==
- Nutating disc engine
