= Nikolaos Mavridis =

Greece roboticist and AI researcher (born 1973)

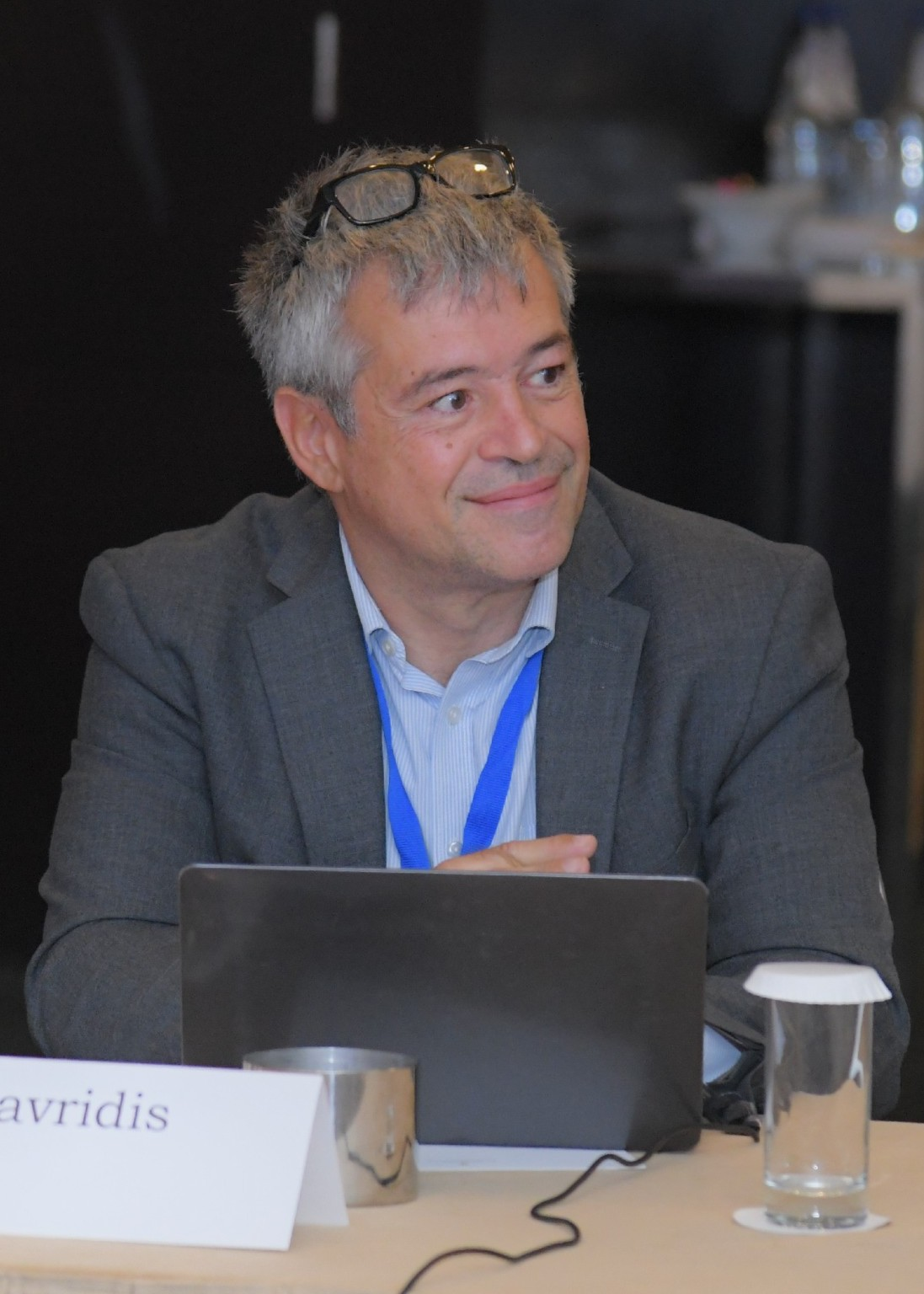
- Mavridis in 2024
- Born: April 28, 1973 (age 53)
- Citizenship: Greece
- Education: MIT
- Scientific career
- Fields: Robotics, artificial intelligence, cognitive systems
- Workplaces: NYU Poly, NCSR Demokritos, Innopolis University Innopolis

Nikolaos Mavridis (born April 28, 1973) is the founder and director of the Interactive Robots and Media Lab (IRML), and a PhD graduate from the Massachusetts Institute of Technology. He is also an assistant professor of research at the Computer Science department, New York University Polytechnic, and adjunct researcher at NCSR Demokritos. Before his PhD, he was awarded an M.Sc. from the University of California, Los Angeles, and an M.Eng. (summa cum laude) from the Aristotle University of Thessaloniki. His research interests include human–robot interaction, and especially verbal and non-verbal communication with robots, artificial intelligence, machine perception, and cognitive systems.

Mavridis and his work at the Interactive Robots and Media Lab received coverage from media of more than 20 countries, such as the BBC, Agence France-Presse (AFP), The National (Abu Dhabi), Al Jazeera TV, etc. Furthermore, Mavridis has been a TEDx Speaker twice, at TEDx Al Ain and TEDx Athens.

Apart from his academic activities, Mavridis has been a pro-bono contributor to several organizations: as a mentor in The Next Generation Initiative, a vice-president and executive committee member at the MIT HSA, as a vice-president to the Hellenic Artificial Intelligence Society, as a bid preparer and presenter and technical committee member that brought the World Robot Olympiad to Abu Dhabi, and as the founding chair of the IEEE UAE Robotics and Automation Society.

He is also an active member of the Horasis think tank based in Switzerland, whose purpose is to "enact visions for a sustainable future" through new platforms for cooperation and knowledge-sharing, particularly between developed countries and emerging markets.

Furthermore, Mavridis is a member of the National Committee of the Recreate Greece liberal party, and as a parliamentary candidate finished second in the May 2012 National Election in the district of A' Athens.
