= Alice G. Bryant =

American otorhinolaryngologist (1862–1942)

- Born: 1862
- Died: June 25, 1942 (aged 79–80); Palmer Memorial hospital, U.S.
- Education: Massachusetts Institute of Technology; Vassar College; Women's Medical College in New York

Alice G. Bryant specialized in many specific body parts, some of these include: The ear, nose and throat.

Alice G. Bryant (1862 – June 25, 1942) was an American otorhinolaryngologist. She studied at Massachusetts Institute of Technology (M.I.T.) from 1882–3, as well as Vassar in 1885 where she received an undergraduate degree, ultimately finishing her education in 1890 at Women's Medical College in New York with her Medical Degree. She was one of the first women to be accepted by the American College of Surgeons in 1914. She worked as a medical practitioner at both the New England Hospital for Women and Children and the New England Deaconess. She is known to have kept flexible hours and established an evening clinic for the convenience of her patients at Boston Trinity Dispensary. She maintained her practice up until she fell ill and died on July 25, 1942, aged 79 or 80.

== Inventions ==
Many of Bryant's inventions are in use today for surgical purposes. She invented various surgical tools, including an instrument for removing tonsils known as a "tonsil tenaculum," bone gripping forceps, a tonsil snare cannula, tonsil separators, and a device to remove nasal polyps known as a nasal polypus hook. She also developed an electronic device that allowed her to move equipment in her office with her foot and keep her hands free.

== Other contributions ==
Bryant authored over 75 articles during her lifetime. She was not only a physician, but an engineer of public health and researcher of home heating and ventilating. Aside from a surgeon and inventor, she was also a teacher, artist, and writer. She was a member of 56 societies, American and British, for both scientific and humanitarian purposes.Bryant is also considered to be one of the early pioneers who is accredited for her devotion to pediatric otolaryngology.
