= Michelle S. Hoo Fatt =

American mechanical engineer

Michelle S. Hoo Fatt is an American mechanical engineer whose research concerns the mechanics of blasts, impacts, buckling, and the ability of sandwich-structured composite materials to resist blasts and ballistic impacts. She is a professor of mechanical engineering at the University of Akron.

== Education and career ==
Hoo Fatt majored in mechanical engineering at the Massachusetts Institute of Technology (MIT), graduating in 1987. She continued at MIT for a master's degree in ocean engineering in 1990 and a Ph.D. in structural mechanics, through the department of ocean engineering, in 1992. Her dissertation, Deformation and Rupture of Cylindrical Shells under Dynamic Loading, was supervised by Tomasz Wierzbicki.

As a graduate student, she also worked as an analyst at the Naval Surface Warfare Center. After postdoctoral research at the Department of Naval Architecture and Offshore Engineering at the University of California, Berkeley and at MIT, she joined the University of Akron as an assistant professor of mechanical engineering in 1995. She was promoted to associate professor in 2001 and full professor in 2010.

Hoo Fatt served on the executive committee of the Tire Society from 2011-2014.

== Recognition ==
Hoo Fatt was named as an ASME Fellow in 2013.
