= Leelila Strogov =

American news reporter

Leelila Strogov is an American news reporter.

== Biography ==
=== Career ===
Leelila Strogov is a general assignment reporter for Fox 11 News (KTTV) specializing in investigative and feature reports. Her career in broadcasting began at Fox 11 in 2004 where she worked first as a news researcher, and later as an investigative producer at the station. She is a member of the Society of Professional Journalists, the L.A. Press Club, and the Radio & Television News Association of Southern California. Prior to joining Fox 11, Leelila worked for Juno Online Services, Inc., an internet company she helped take public on the NASDAQ stock market as the senior vice president of business development.

=== Personal ===
Leelila grew up in Brooklyn, New York through her early teens. Later, she spent much of her time living and studying abroad, in Switzerland, England, Israel and Guatemala. As a hobby, Leelila is also a writer and editor. In 2004 she launched the non-profit literary magazine, Swink.

=== Education ===
Leelila Strogov holds a Bachelor of Science degree from the Massachusetts Institute of Technology.

=== Published work ===
Leelila Strogov's short fiction and essays have been published in a variety of magazines and books, including Before and After: Stories From New York(W. W. Norton) and New Sudden Fiction: Short Stories from America and Beyond (W. W. Norton). HarperCollins also chose one of her pieces for inclusion in their Digital Media Café, where selected stories are performed by accomplished Hollywood actors in front of a live audience, and then recorded and made accessible online.

=== Awards ===
Leelila was nominated for Emmy Awards for her journalism work in 2005 and 2006.

=== Community service ===
Leelila is an active supporter of a non-profit organization in Venice called 826LA, dedicated to helping students from the ages of 6 through 18 develop their creative and expository writing skills.
