= Jane Clarke =

Jane Clarke may refer to:

- Jane Clarke (scientist) (born 1950), professor of molecular biophysics at the University of Cambridge
- Jane E. Clarke (born 1954), children's author
- Jane Clarke (media industry)
- Jane Clarke (milliner) (born 1794), Victorian businesswoman
- Jane Clarke (poet), from Co. Roscommon, Ireland
- Jane Clarke (EastEnders) fictional character better known as Jane Beale.

== See also ==
- Mary Jane Clarke (1862–1910), suffragette
