= We Are Smarter Than Me =

Book by Barry Libert

We Are Smarter Than Me: How to Unleash the Power of Crowds in Your Business
- We Are Smarter Than Me
- Author: Barry Libert; Jon Spector and hundreds of other contributors
- Language: English
- Genre: Non-fiction
- Publisher: Wharton School Publishing
- Publication date: October 5, 2007
- Publication place: United States
- Media type: Hardcover
- Pages: 176 pp (Hardcover edition)
- ISBN: 978-0-13-224479-4
- OCLC: 144330898
- Dewey Decimal: 658/.044 22
- LC Class: HD69.S8 L53 2008

We Are Smarter Than Me is a collaborative-writing project using wiki software, whose initial goal was producing a book about decision making processes that use large numbers of people. The first book was published as a printed book, late in 2007, by the publishing conglomerate Pearson Education. Along with Pearson, the project's four core sponsors include research institutes of the MIT Sloan School of Management and the Wharton School of the University of Pennsylvania.

The wiki book was featured in a November 28, 2006, broadcast of NPR's All Things Considered.

== History and overview of project ==
The project was started as "a business community formed by business professionals to research and discuss the impact of social networks on traditional business functions". Initiated by internationally recognized faculty from the Wharton School and MIT Sloan School of Management.

The people behind this initiative are Barry Libert, CEO of Shared Insights, Jon Spector, vice dean and director of Wharton's Aresty Institute of Executive Education, Thomas W. Malone, Patrick J. McGovern Professor of Management at the MIT Sloan School of Management, and founder and director of the MIT Center for Collective Intelligence, Tim Moore, editor-in-chief of Pearson Education and Jerry (Yoram) Wind, Lauder Professor and Professor of Marketing at the Wharton Business School of the University of Pennsylvania and founding director of the Wharton “think tank,” the SEI Center for Advanced Studies in Management.

The project was started in late 2006 and a wiki website was established to allow people to contribute text to the book. It was published on October 5, 2007.

=== Participation ===
According to the project's website, "over a million students, faculty and alumni of the Wharton School of the University of Pennsylvania and the MIT Sloan School of Management, as well as leaders, authors, and experts from the fields of management and technology were invited to contribute in a wiki-based community that coalesced at wearesmarter.org. Members were asked to develop and share their insights about why community approaches work or don't work when it comes to marketing, business development, distribution, and more, and what companies have to do to make them work better."

They had reached the following participation statistics by the time the book was ready for publication:

- 4375 registered members
- 737 forum posts
- 250 wiki contributors
- 1600 wiki posts

The project's website reports that, "In addition to actual community members and contributors, the project was influenced by hundreds of bloggers, Podcasters, and conference attendees at the inaugural Community 2.0 Conference in Las Vegas."

=== Advisory board ===
The project's advisory board for phase 1 (the writing of the first book) included:

Chairman:

- Thomas W. Malone — the Patrick J. McGovern Professor of Management at the MIT Sloan School of Management, founder and director of the MIT Center for Collective Intelligence.

Board members:

- Tim Moore of Wharton School Publishing and FTPress.
- Jimmy Wales — founder and former Chair of the Board of Trustees of the Wikimedia Foundation.
- Yoram (Jerry) Wind is The Lauder Professor and Professor of Marketing at the Wharton School of the University of Pennsylvania. He is the founding director of the Wharton "think tank", The SEI Center for Advanced Studies in Management.
- Philip Evans — a senior vice president in the Boston office of the Boston Consulting Group, author of the best-selling book Blown to Bits.

=== Content ===
According to the authors, "the goal of the project was to develop a book that addresses what other best-selling books on community have not. Wikinomics and The Wisdom of Crowds have identified the phenomena of emerging social networks, but they do not confront how businesses can profit from the wisdom of crowds".

The book contains case studies from several companies, including Eli Lilly and Company, Amazon.com, Dell Computers, Cambrian House, Angie's List and Procter & Gamble

== Media coverage and acceptance ==
The project received wide coverage in US media, including such venues as The Wall Street Journal, Forbes.com, Newsweek and NPR's radio show "All Things Considered". The book was ranked #6 in Amazon's "Best of 2007" and "Top 10 book to inspire your business for 2008" from TheStreet.com.

== Further and related reading ==
- Don Tapscott and Anthony D. Williams (2006). Wikinomics: How Mass Collaboration Changes Everything. Portfolio. ISBN 978-1-59184-193-7.
- Yochai Benkler (2007). The Wealth of Networks: How Social Production Transforms Markets and Freedom. Yale University Press. ISBN 978-0-300-12577-1.
- Surowiecki, James (2004). The Wisdom of Crowds: Why the Many Are Smarter Than the Few and How Collective Wisdom Shapes Business, Economies, Societies and Nations Little, Brown ISBN 0-316-86173-1
- Cass R. Sunstein, Infotopia: How Many Minds Produce Knowledge (2006) Oxford University Press, ISBN 0-19-518928-0
- Thomas W. Malone, The Future of Work: How the New Order of Business Will Shape Your Organization, Your Management Style and Your Life Harvard Business School Press (April 2, 2004) ISBN 978-1-59139-125-8
