= Mark Leiter (businessman) =

American businessman

Mark Leiter is a leading strategy expert who is the founder and Chairman of Leiter+Company and Vice Chairman at Honor Education. He is a Distinguished Strategy Fellow at The Conference Board and serves as a Trustee of the Committee for Economic Development (CED).

He has served as Chief Digital Strategy Officer at Boeing following his role as Chief Strategy Officer at Nielsen. Prior to serving as chief strategy officer, he served as Nielsen's global president of practices and consulting services.

Earlier in his career, he was with McKinsey & Company where he was co-founder and co-director of McKinsey's Branding practice, a founder of McKinsey's B2B Marketing practice, and author of multiple McKinsey Quarterly articles.

He is the co-founder (with Jonathan Spector) and former Chairman of the Board of Directors of The Demand Institute.
