= Jay Rosen =

American journalist

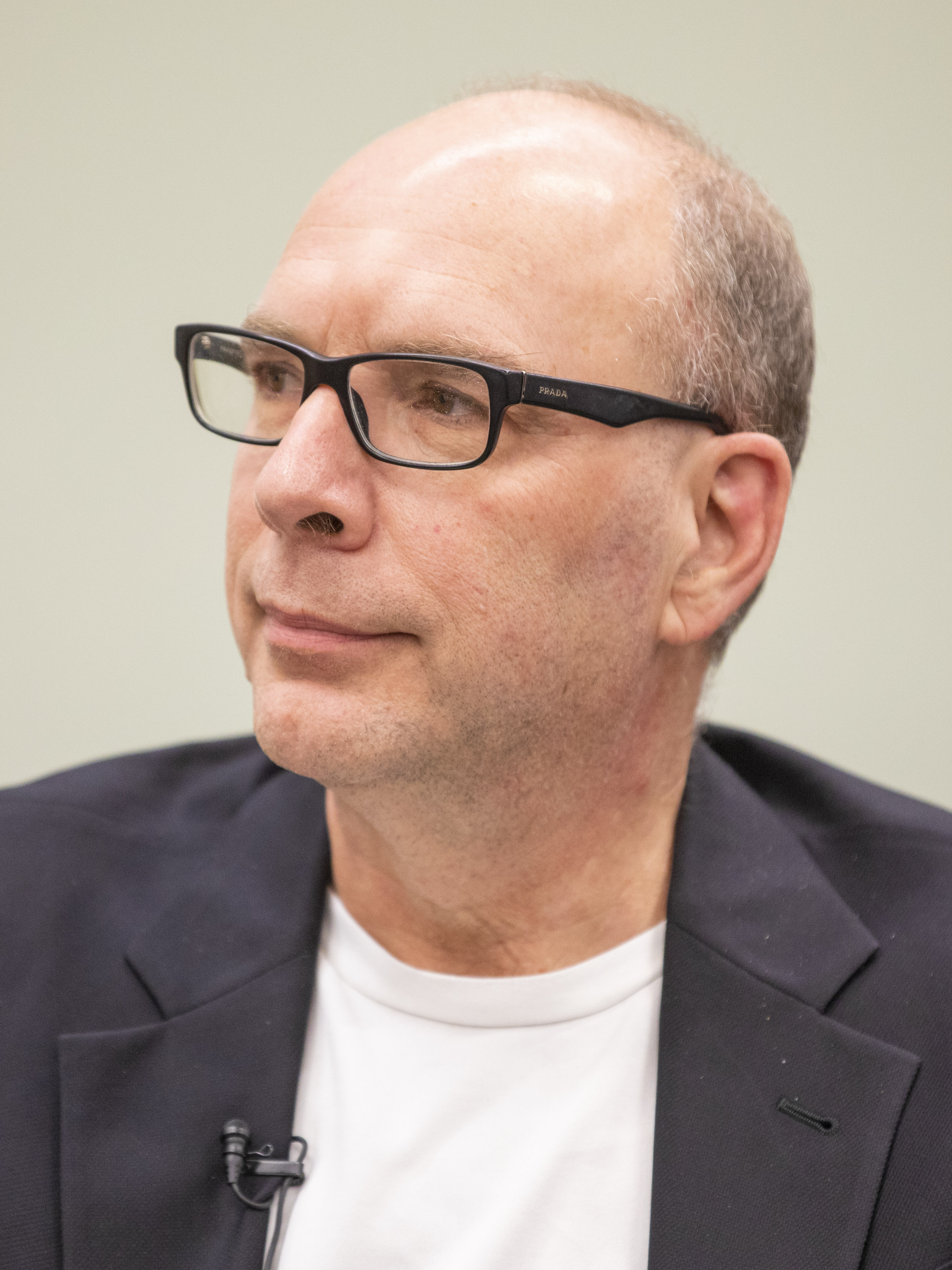
- Rosen in 2019
- Born: May 5, 1956 (age 70); Buffalo, New York, United States
- Education: State University of New York at Buffalo (B.A., 1979); New York University (M.A., 1981; Ph.D., 1986)
- Occupations: Press critic, writer, and journalism academic

Jay Rosen (born May 5, 1956) is an associate professor of journalism at New York University. He is a contributor to De Correspondent and a member of the George Foster Peabody Awards Board of Directors.

== Biography ==
Rosen received his undergraduate degree from the State University of New York at Buffalo in 1979 and M.A. (1981) & Ph.D. (1986) degrees from the New York University Media Ecology Program (since subsumed into the Steinhardt School of Culture, Education, and Human Development's Department of Media, Culture, and Communication). Noted media theorist Neil Postman chaired Rosen's dissertation committee.

He joined New York University's Department of Journalism (now known as the Arthur L. Carter Journalism Institute) in 1986. From 1999 to 2005, he served as chair of the department.

He was one of the earliest advocates and supporters of citizen journalism, encouraging the press to take a more active interest in citizenship, improving public debate, and enhancing life. His book about the subject, What Are Journalists For?, was published in 1999. Rosen often is described in the media as an intellectual leader of the movement of public journalism.

Rosen frequently writes about issues in journalism and developments in the media. Media criticism and other articles by Rosen have appeared in The New York Times, Los Angeles Times, Salon, Harper's Magazine, and The Nation. He is known for his use of terms such as, "view from nowhere", to criticize ideas about journalistic objectivity.

He authors the PressThink blog on "the fate of the press in a digital era and the challenges involved in rethinking what journalism is today". It won the Reporters Without Borders Freedom Blog award in 2005. Rosen is a semi-regular contributor to The Huffington Post.

In 1994, Rosen was named a fellow of the Shorenstein Center at Harvard University.

In July 2006, he announced a project, NewAssignment.net, linking professional journalists and internet users. The project has received contributions of $10,000 by the Sunlight Foundation, $10,000 by Craig Newmark, $75,000 from Cambrian House, and $100,000 by Reuters.

Since 2009 Rosen has collaborated with technologist and writer Dave Winer on Rebooting the News, a weekly podcast on technology and innovation in journalism.

In 2013, Rosen announced he would be serving in an advisory capacity to Pierre Omidyar's new journalism venture, First Look Media.

In 2016, he addressed the prospects for journalism under the presidency of Trump in two articles on the PressThink blog, given the growing concerns among journalists. The first, Winter is coming: prospects for the American press under Trump was followed by, Prospects for the American press under Trump, part two and that dialogue has persisted among journalists and bloggers as a continuing concern.

In 2018, Rosen recommended to readers of his blog that they join an American-based news service and site that plans to begin publishing in 2019, entitled, The Correspondent that will be published in English and is modeled after the Dutch de Correspondent. The format is intended to be a subscription service that is ad-free, with variable rates that depend upon the financial level of support determined by the subscriber.

The Correspondent began publishing in 2019 but it ceased publication December 31, 2020.

== Bibliography ==
=== Books ===
- Rosen, Jay (1996). Getting the Connections Right: Public Journalism and the Troubles in the Press. Twentieth Century Fund. ISBN 9780870783852.
- Rosen, Jay (1999). What are Journalists For?. Yale University Press. ISBN 9780300089073.
