= CIMM (disambiguation) =

CIMM is an acronym that can stand for:

- Capability Immaturity Model (CIMM), which contrast to the Capability Maturity Model (CMM)
- Canadian Institute of Mining, Metallurgy and Petroleum
- The Coalition for Innovative Media Measurement
- Committee on Citizenship and Immigration, a Canadian review panel dealing with immigration
- Mining and Metallurgy Research Center (Centro de Investigación Minera y Metalúrgica), a Chilean research intuition.
