= Mark Leiter (disambiguation) =

Mark Leiter may refer to:

- Mark Leiter (born 1963), American baseball pitcher
- Mark Leiter Jr. (born 1991), American baseball pitcher
- Mark Leiter (businessman), American businessman
