= Antwerp Tower =

Skyscraper in Belgium

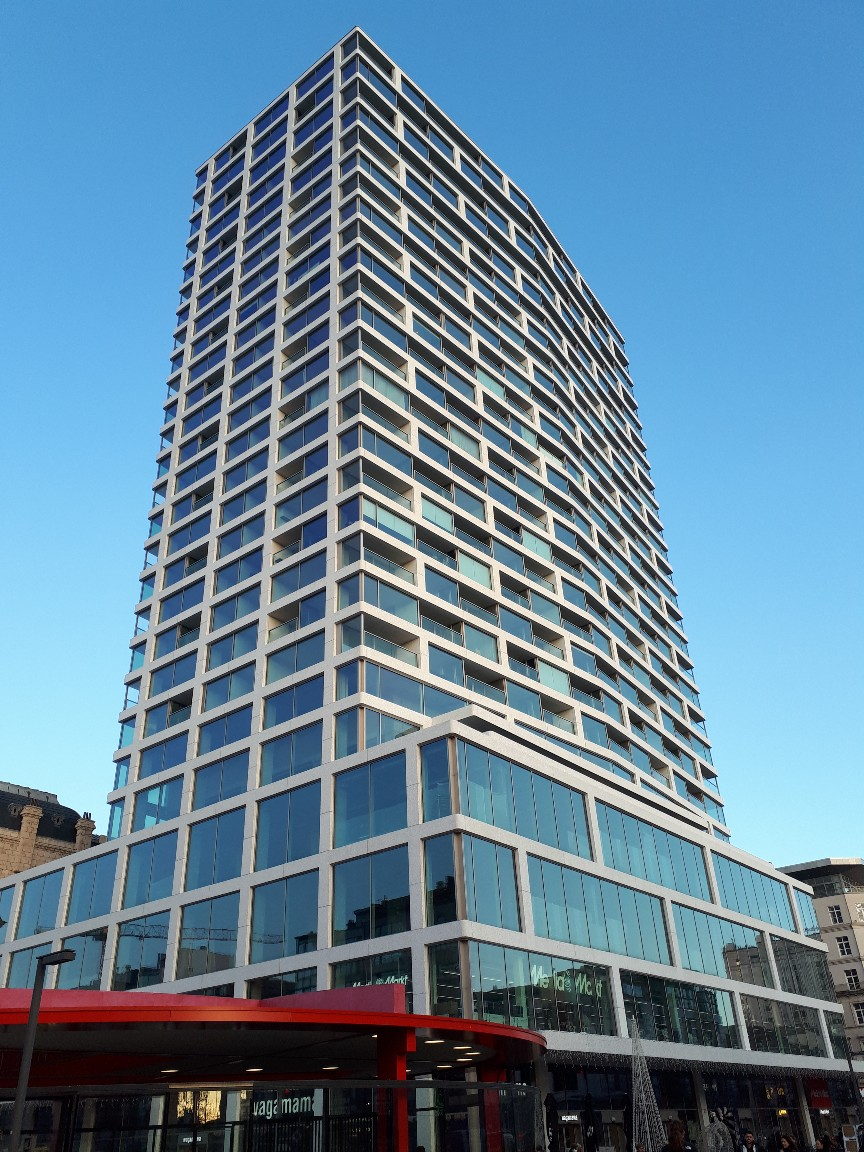
- Interactive map of the Antwerp Tower area
- Alternative names: A-Tower

General information
- Status: Completed
- Type: Residential, Commercial, Offices
- Architectural style: Modern
- Location: Frankrijklei; Antwerp, Belgium
- Coordinates: 51.218000°N 4.416227°E

Height
- Roof: 100.7 m (330 ft)

Technical details
- Floor count: 26

Design and construction
- Architects: Jozef Fuyen, Guy Peeters (Original); Wiel Arets (Renovation)

The Antwerp Tower is a skyscraper in Antwerp (Belgium). Originally built in 1974 with a height of 87 m (285 ft), the Antwerp Tower was the third-tallest building in Antwerp, behind the Cathedral of our Lady and the Boerentoren. After the completion of an extensive renovation in 2019-2021, where two double-height floors were added, the Antwerp Tower is now the second-tallest building in the city overall and the highest residential building, with a height of 100.70 m (330.4 ft).

== History ==
Since 1900, the site had been the location of the "Grand Hotel Weber", a Belle Époque-style luxury hotel, which was severely damaged by bombings in World War II and stood empty for almost 20 years until it was demolished in the late 1960s. The site was subsequently sold to developers who erected Antwerp Tower, an 87 m (285 ft) high office building which opened in 1974. Despite counting prominent companies among its renters, such as Yellow Pages and Unilever, the office building never became popular and renting out offices became increasingly difficult. In 2012 the building was sold to Wilma Project Development, a part of the Matexi Group, who intended to convert the tower to residential units after an extensive renovation. Before the renovation, the Antwerp Tower was often considered to be one of the ugliest buildings in Europe, both due to its out-of-place location and its copper-colored facade.

== Renovation ==
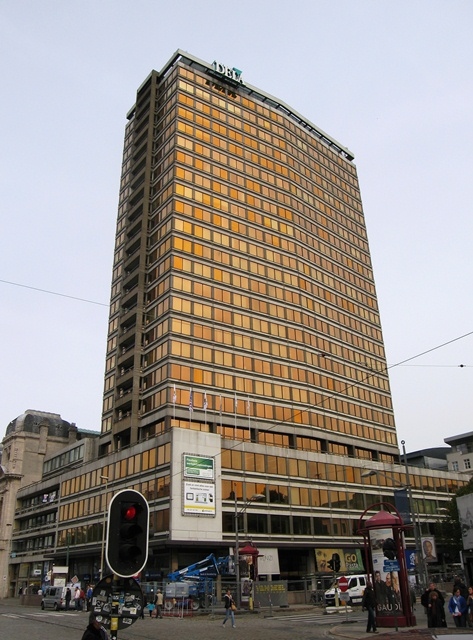
Antwerp Tower in 2012, prior to the renovation

Wilma Project Development, a part of the Matexi Group, purchased the building in 2012 for 25 million Euros. The renovation started in 2017 and was finished in 2021. The building was transformed from an office building to a mainly residential tower, with only limited commercial and office space on the lower levels. The building was gut renovated, the dimensions were altered by adding two double height floors on top and widening the floors on all levels. The finished tower has a total of 241 residential units.

== Commercial and office spaces ==
Restaurants Hawaiian Poké Bowl and Pitaya occupy the commercial spaces on the ground floor, consumer electronics retailer Media Markt occupies the first floor. Real estate investor Befimmo purchased three office floors, which will become a Silversquare coworking location starting in 2022.
