= Boerentoren =

Historic high-rise building in Antwerp, Belgium

KBC Tower
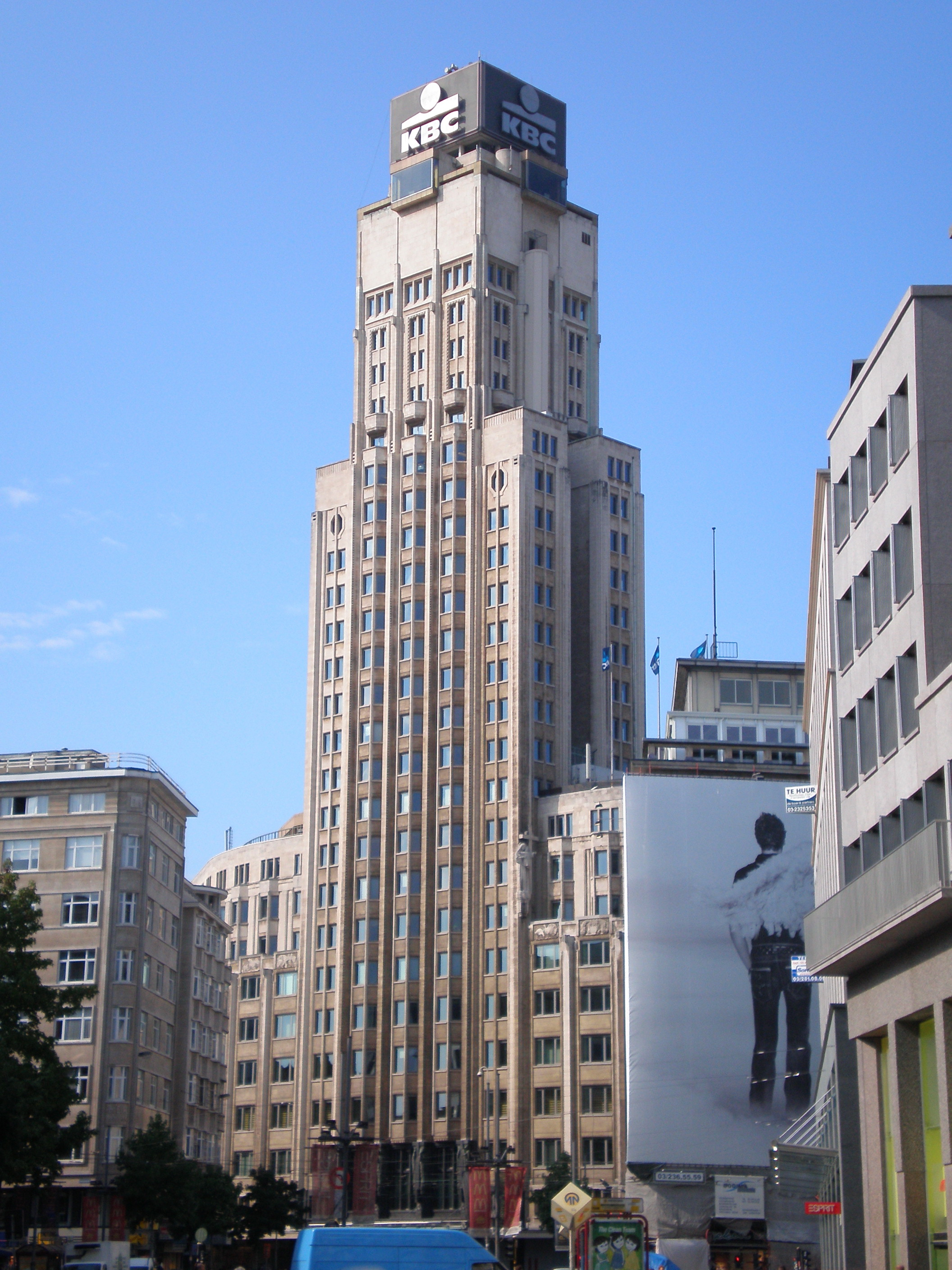
- The KBC Tower in 2006
- Interactive map of the KBC Tower area
- Alternative names: Boerentoren; Torengebouw

General information
- Type: Commercial offices
- Architectural style: Art Deco
- Location: Schoenmarkt 35, Antwerp, Belgium
- Coordinates: 51.218611°N 4.404167°E
- Construction started: 1929
- Completed: 1932

Height
- Antenna spire: 112.5 m (369 ft)
- Roof: 95.8 m (314 ft)

Technical details
- Floor count: 26
- Lifts/elevators: 15

Design and construction
- Architects: Emiel van Averbeke; Jan R. Van Hoenacker; Jos Smolderen

The Boerentoren (English: "Farmers' Tower"; officially the KBC Tower, originally the Torengebouw van Antwerpen) is a historic high-rise building in Antwerp, Belgium. Constructed between 1929 and 1932 and originally 87.5 m (287 ft) high, it remained the tallest building and the second-tallest structure in the city (after the Gothic Cathedral of Our Lady) until 2019, when the Antwerp Tower surpassed it with a height of 100.7 m (330 ft). At the time of construction, it was the second tallest building in Europe by roof height (after the Telefónica Building in Madrid).

Designed in Art Deco style by Jan Vanhoenacker, Émile Van Averbeke and Jos Smolderen, the Boerentoren was one of Europe's very first tall buildings. It remained the tallest in Belgium until 1960, and is currently ranked 21st tallest in the country. In 1954, the tower was extended with an antenna, reaching a total height of 112.5 m (369 ft). In 1976, the tower's roof was raised by 8.3 m (27 ft), and the current roof height is 95.8 m (314 ft).

== History ==
=== Construction and World War II damage ===
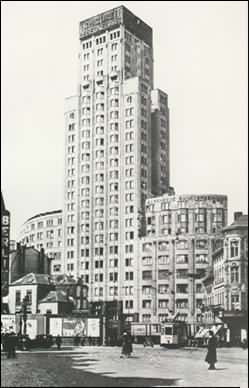
The Torengebouw van Antwerpen in the 1930s

The Torengebouw van Antwerpen was designed in anticipation of the 1930 International Exhibition of Colonial, Maritime and Flemish Art in Antwerp to mark the centenary of Belgian independence. It is the work of the architects Jan Vanhoenacker, Émile Van Averbeke and Jos Smolderen. Construction began in 1931 as a revolutionary project. The builder was Middenkredietbank, which mainly managed money for farmers and the Farmers' Union, owing the tower its nickname Boerentoren (lit. 'Farmers' Tower'). Later, the building passed into the hands of Kredietbank and KBC Group, whose logo appears at the top of tower. On 1 September 1930, the shops on the ground floor at the Schoenmarkt were ready, and the Torenkelder brasserie was opened on 15 December. By the autumn of 1931, most of the offices and apartments had been rented. The building was completed on 24 December 1931. The panoramic room on the 24th floor was opened to the public on 19 March 1932, and the bank moved into the new offices on 29 March.

In September 1944, the building was damaged by German grenade fire and on 6 January 1945 by a V-1 4 bomb.

=== Restoration and repurposing ===
Until 1969, little or nothing changed in the tower building (except for the addition of an antenna in 1954), but in 1970 restoration began and a new wing was added along the Eiermarkt. According to the original contract, that wing should have been built together with the main building, but was not realised due to the bank's financial problems. In 1976, the roof of the tower was raised by 8.3 m (27 ft) and a new panoramic room was added on the 26th floor, above the water tank. As the tower is now used entirely as an office by KBC, the room is no longer made accessible to the public for safety reasons. The building received protected status through a royal decree issued on 17 July 1981.

In 2020, the company Katoen Natie acquired the tower with the intention of turning it into a cultural institution, while The Phoebus Foundation chancellery will be responsible for organising permanent and temporary exhibitions with works from its collection, alongside public and private collaborations. Work started in the summer of 2021. Demolition and remediation would take 36 months; completion is expected by 2026. A six-year term was set at the end of 2022 (three years of remediation and three years of building new parts).

On 18 August 2022, a short, intense fire broke out on the fourth floor of the tower building along the Eiermarkt side. No significant damage was caused.

== Gallery ==
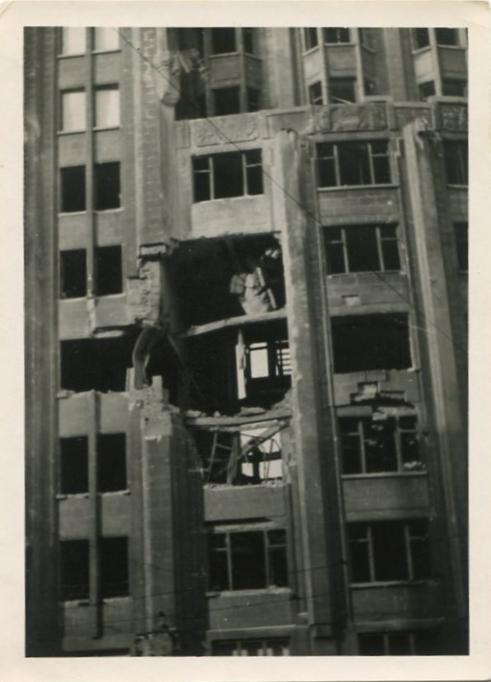
Buzzbomb (V-1) damage to the Torengebouw during World War II

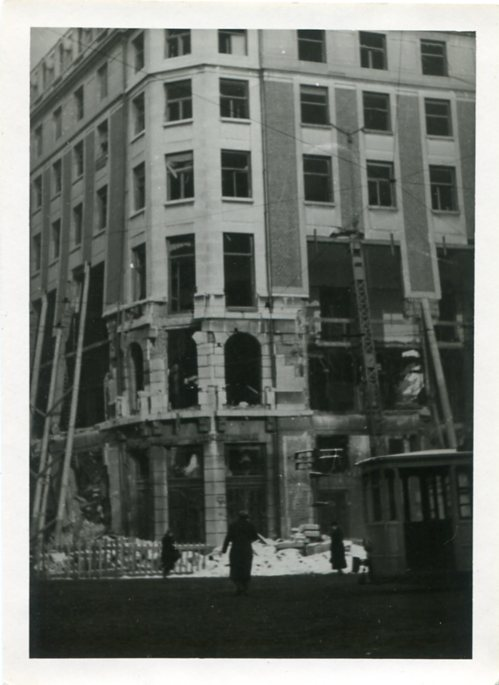
Buzzbomb damage to the Torengebouw during World War II

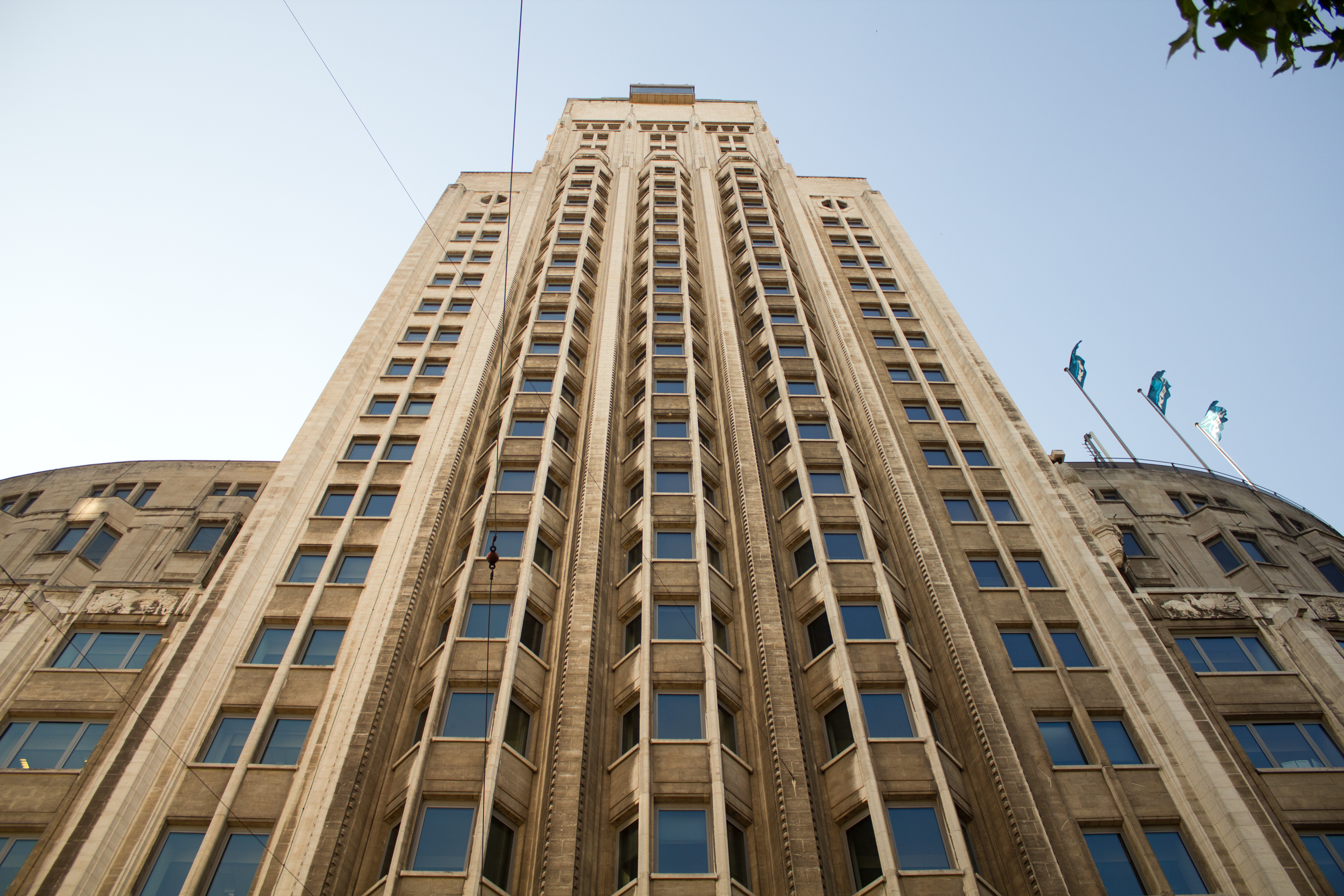
View of Boerentoren from base

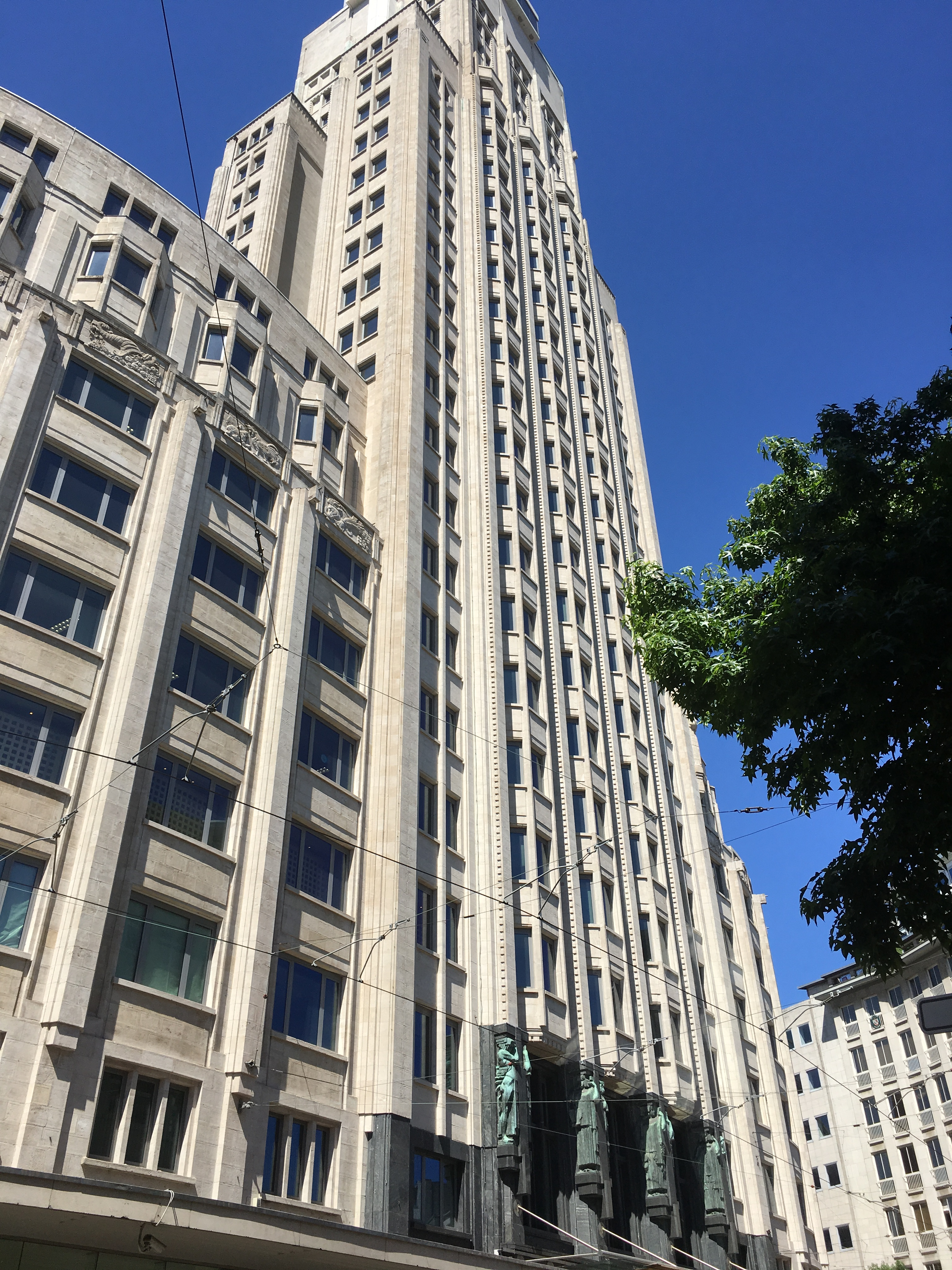
View of Boerentoren

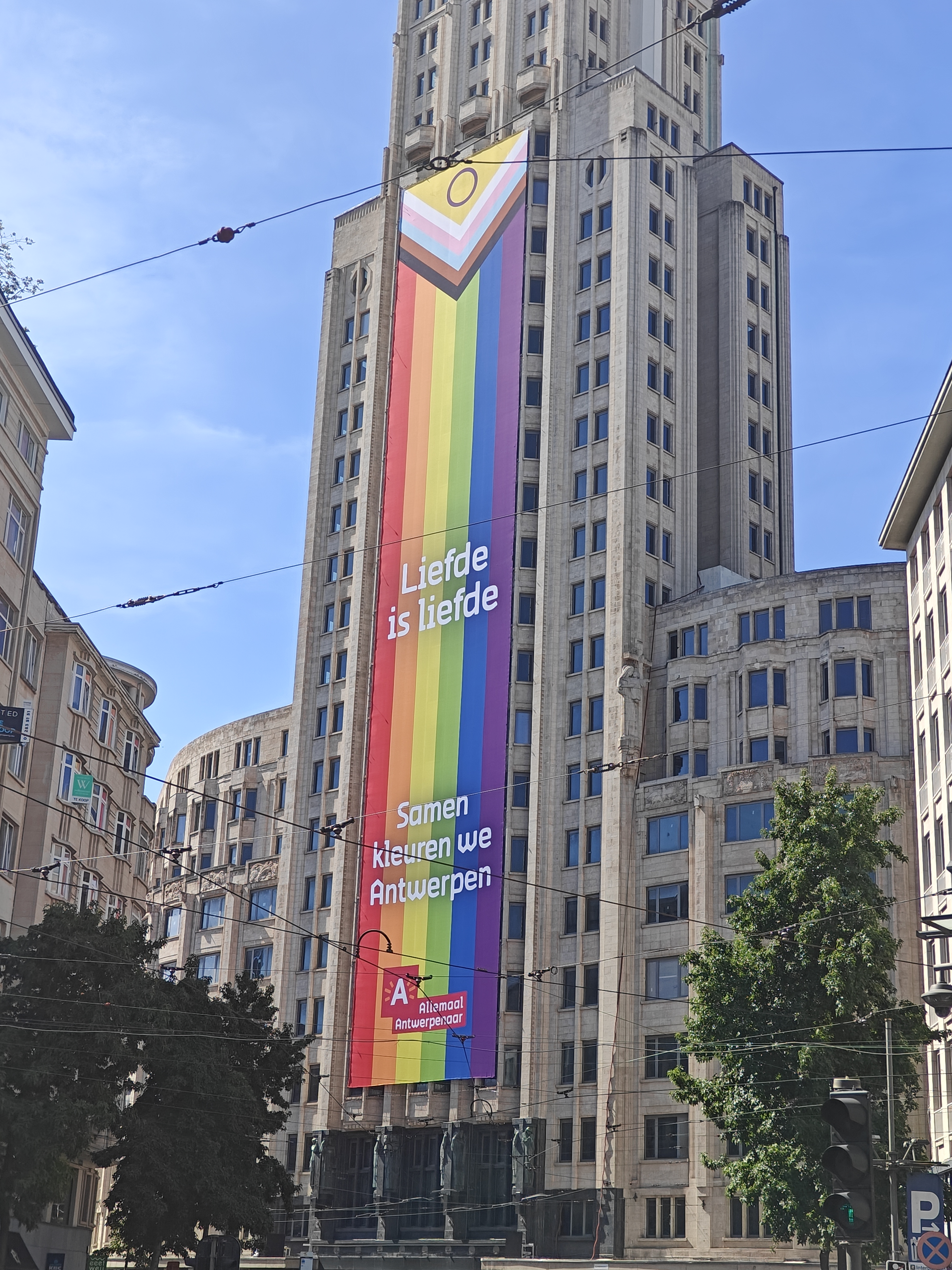
During Antwerp Pride 2026
