= Elise Jaeger =

English fashion designer

Elizabeth "Elise" Marie Louise Jaeger, known as Madame Elise (1836–1913) was an English dressmaker. She was the founder of The Madame Elise label and fashion house. She was the official dressmaker, to H.R.H the Princess of Wales.

== Biography ==
Elizabeth Marie Louise Jaeger was the daughter of a banker from Frankfurt, Germany. On January 10, 1857, she married the businessman Frederick Wootton Isaacson (1836–1898).

In the 1851 London census she was recorded as a milliner working for the dressmaker and lace seller Jane Clarke, at 170 Regent Street, in Mayfair. In 1859, Clarke retired and sold her business to Elise and Frederick Isaacson. The business was developed by Elise to a major fashion business during the 1860s and 1870s. She gained an appointment from the Princess of Wales, Alexandra of Denmark, the wife to King Edward VII. Her business expanded to include a warehouse and workroom under the Isaacson name at 62 & 63 King Street near St. James's Square.

Elise also write books and magazine articles about fashionable dress and textile craft.

== Legacy ==
In 1884, her business was sold to Charles Chatteris (1848–1903). He continued to operate under the Madame Elise label, until he was required to change the name to Madame Elise and Company in 1887. The business was incorporated as a Ltd in 1890, and dissolved after the death of Charles Chatteris in 1903.
