= Thomas W. Malone =

American business theorist (born 1952)

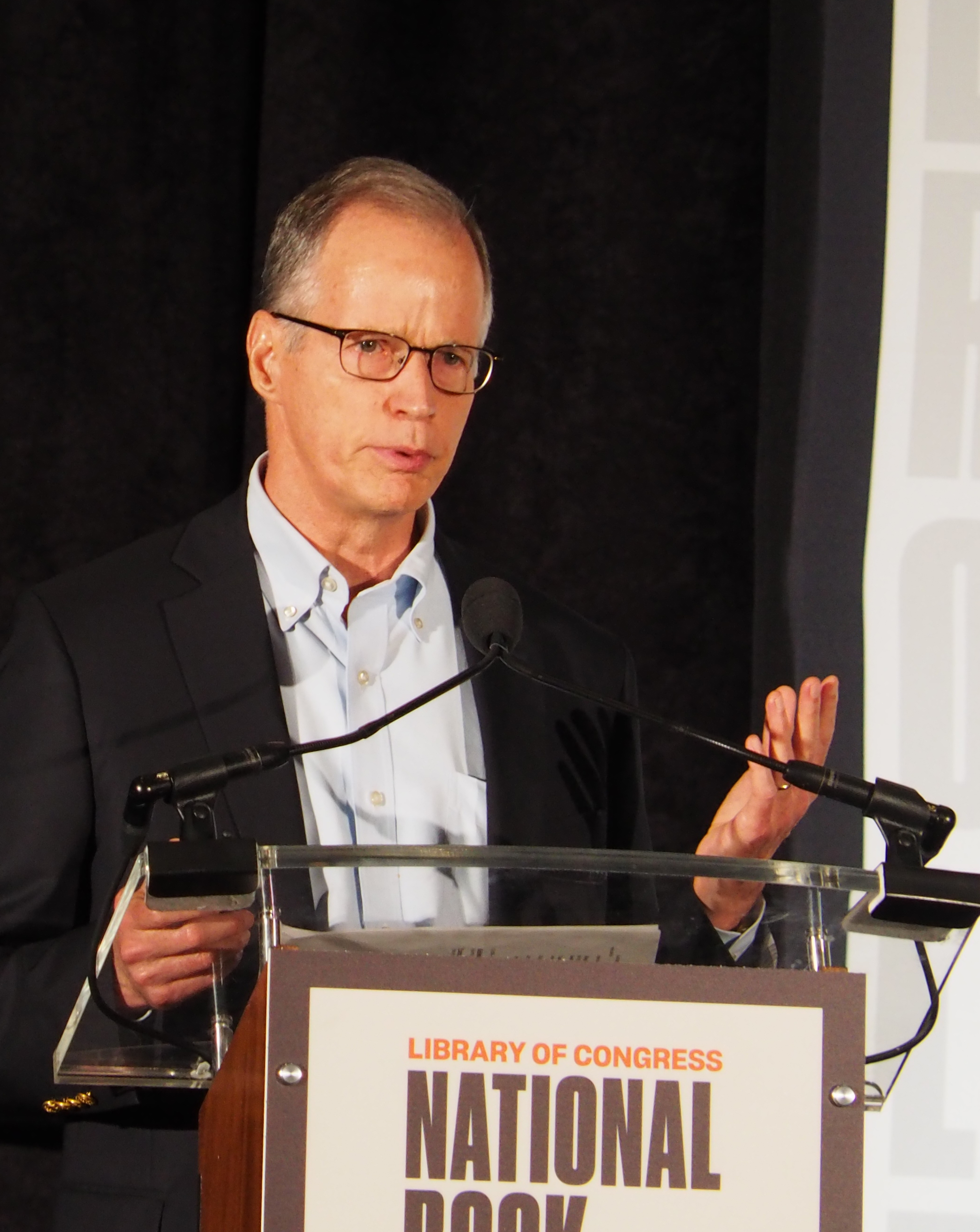
- Malone at the Library of Congress in 2019
- Born: 1952 (age 73–74)
- Citizenship: United States
- Education: Rice University; Stanford University
- Known for: MIT Center for Collective Intelligence, We Are Smarter Than Me
- Scientific career
- Fields: Information Systems; Organizational theory Artificial Intelligence
- Workplaces: MIT Sloan School of Management
- Thesis: What makes things fun to learn? A study of intrinsically motivating computer games (1980)
- Doctoral advisor: Patrick Suppes
- Doctoral students: Erik Brynjolfsson; Paul Resnick

Thomas Wendell Malone (born 1952) is an American organizational theorist, management consultant, and the Patrick J. McGovern Professor of Management at the MIT Sloan School of Management.

== Biography ==
Malone received his BA in applied mathematics, graduating magna cum laude from Rice University. He earned his MS in engineering-economic systems, and his Ph.D. in cognitive and social psychology, both from Stanford University.

After graduation, Malone started his career as research scientist at the Xerox Palo Alto Research Center (PARC), where he was involved in designing educational software and office information systems. In 1983 he joined MIT, where he was appointed Professor of Management at the MIT Sloan School of Management. At MIT, he founded and directed the MIT Center for Collective Intelligence, and co-founded the MIT Initiative called "Inventing the Organizations of the 21st Century".

Malone has co-founded three software companies, and consulted and served as a board member for a number of other organizations. He speaks frequently for business audiences around the world and has been quoted in numerous publications, including Fortune, The New York Times, and Wired.

== Work ==
Malone's research focuses on how new organizations can be designed to take advantage of the possibilities provided by information technology. At MIT, he teaches classes on leadership, information technology, and artificial intelligence.

Malone's research up to 2004 is summarized in his book The Future of Work: How the New Order of Business Will Shape Your Organization, Your Management Style, and Your Life.

=== Video game design ===
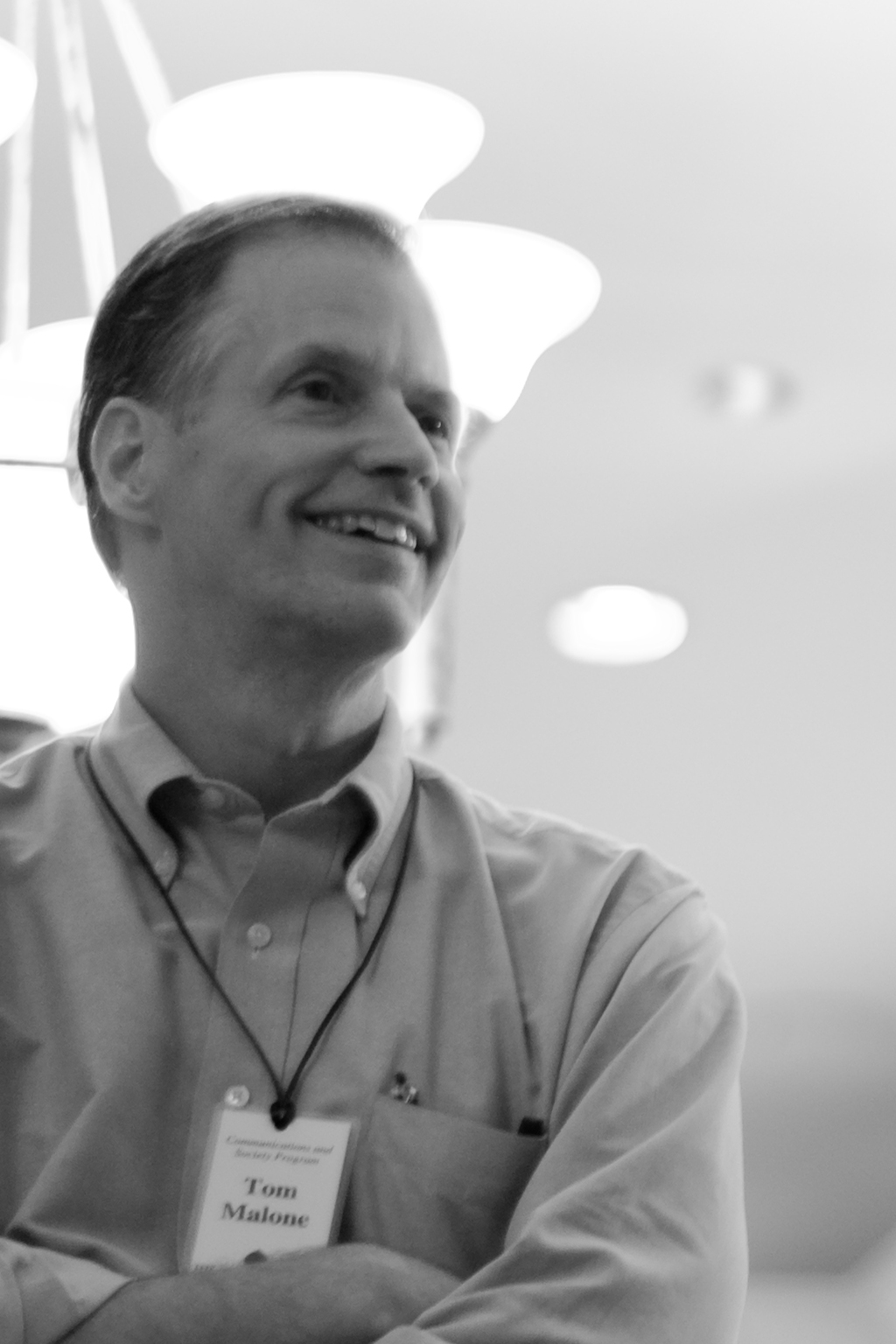
Thomas W. Malone in 2007

Malone has studied sex differences between men and women and video games. In 1980, Malone published papers in the nascent field of video game design. His paper "Toward a theory of intrinsically motivating instruction" was based on his PhD dissertation. Malone's last paper in this field was published in 1987.

=== Electronic business ===
In the 1987 article "Electronic markets and electronic hierarchies" written with Joanne Yates and Robert I. Benjamin, Malone predicted many of the major developments in electronic business over the last decade: electronic buying and selling, electronic markets for many kinds of products, "outsourcing" of non-core functions in a firm, and the use of intelligent agents for commerce.

== Publications ==
Malone has published over 100 articles, research papers, and book chapters and is an inventor with 11 patents. He is the author of six books:

- Coordination Theory and Collaboration Technology, Erlbaum, 2001, ISBN 0415647029
- Inventing the Organizations of the 21st Century, MIT Press, 2003, ISBN 026263273X
- Organizing Business Knowledge: The MIT Process Handbook, MIT Press, 2003, ISBN 9780262134293
- The Future of Work: How the New Order of Business Will Shape Your Organization, Your Management Style, and Your Life, Harvard Business School Press, 2004, ISBN 1591391253
- Handbook of Collective Intelligence., MIT Press, 2015, ISBN 9780262029810
- Superminds: The Surprising Power of People and Computers Thinking Together, Little, Brown and Company, 2019, ISBN 0316349127
