= Nielsen Holdings =

American media audience measurement company

Nielsen Holdings plc
- Trade name: The Nielsen Company
- Type: Private
- Traded as: NYSE: NLSN (2011–2022) S&P 500 component (2013–2022)
- ISIN: GB00BWFY5505
- Industry: Media
- Founded: August 24, 1923; 103 years ago
- Founder: Arthur Nielsen
- Headquarters: New York City, U.S.
- Key people: David Kenny (executive chairman); Karthik Rao (CEO); Jessica Holscott (CFO)
- Products: Audience measurement; Media research
- Revenue: ▲US$3.5 billion (2021)
- Operating income: ▲US$872 million (2021)
- Net income: ▲US$963 million (2021)
- Total assets: ▼US$10.8 billion (2021)
- Total equity: ▲US$3.3 billion (2021)
- Owner: Elliott Investment Management (2022–present)
- Number of employees: c. 15,000 (December 2021)
- Subsidiaries: Gracenote, Nielsen Audio, AGB Nielsen Philippines, Rhiza, Nielsen Media Research, The Demand Institute
- Website: nielsen.com

Nielsen Holdings plc (or simply Nielsen) is an American media audience measurement firm. Nielsen operates in over 100 countries and employs approximately 15,000 people worldwide.

For most of its history, the company was known for its two subsidiaries, Nielsen Media Research, which was responsible for TV ratings, and AC Nielsen, which was responsible for consumer shopping trends and box-office data. Nielsen Media Research later evolved into Global Media division and the AC Nielsen later evolved into Global Connect division. The company later decided to retain its Global Media division and divested the Global Connect division (NielsenIQ, the former AC Nielsen) to private equity firm Advent International in March 2021.

The company was listed on the New York Stock Exchange and used to be a component of the S&P 500.

== History ==
=== Formation ===
Nielsen was founded in 1923 by Arthur C. Nielsen, Sr., who invented an approach to measuring competitive sales results that made the concept of "market share" a practical management tool. The holding company was incorporated in the Netherlands and later was purchased on May 24, 2006, by a consortium of private equity firms.

=== Merger and listing ===
In January 2011, Nielsen consummated an initial public offering of common stock and, subsequently, started trading on the New York Stock Exchange under the symbol "NLSN". On August 31, 2015, Nielsen N.V., a Dutch public company listed on the New York Stock Exchange, merged with Nielsen Holdings plc, by way of a cross-border merger under the European Cross-Border Merger Directive, with Nielsen Holdings plc being the surviving company. The merger effectively changed the place of incorporation of Nielsen's publicly traded parent holding company from the Netherlands to England and Wales, with no changes made to the business being conducted by Nielsen prior to the merger.

=== 2021 split and 2022 buyout ===
On March 5, 2021, Nielsen Holdings announced the completion of sale of Global Connect business (known as NielsenIQ, the former AC Nielsen) to private equity firm Advent International. This transaction effectively turned Nielsen into a pure-play media audience measurement and analytics firm.

In March 2022, Nielsen announced that it had accepted a $16 billion offer from a group of private equity investors led by Elliott Investment Management subsidiary Evergreen Coast Capital Corp., and Brookfield Business Partners. The Nielsen board of directors had turned down an initial $9 billion offer from the investment consortium. The transaction was completed in October 2022.

== Company information ==
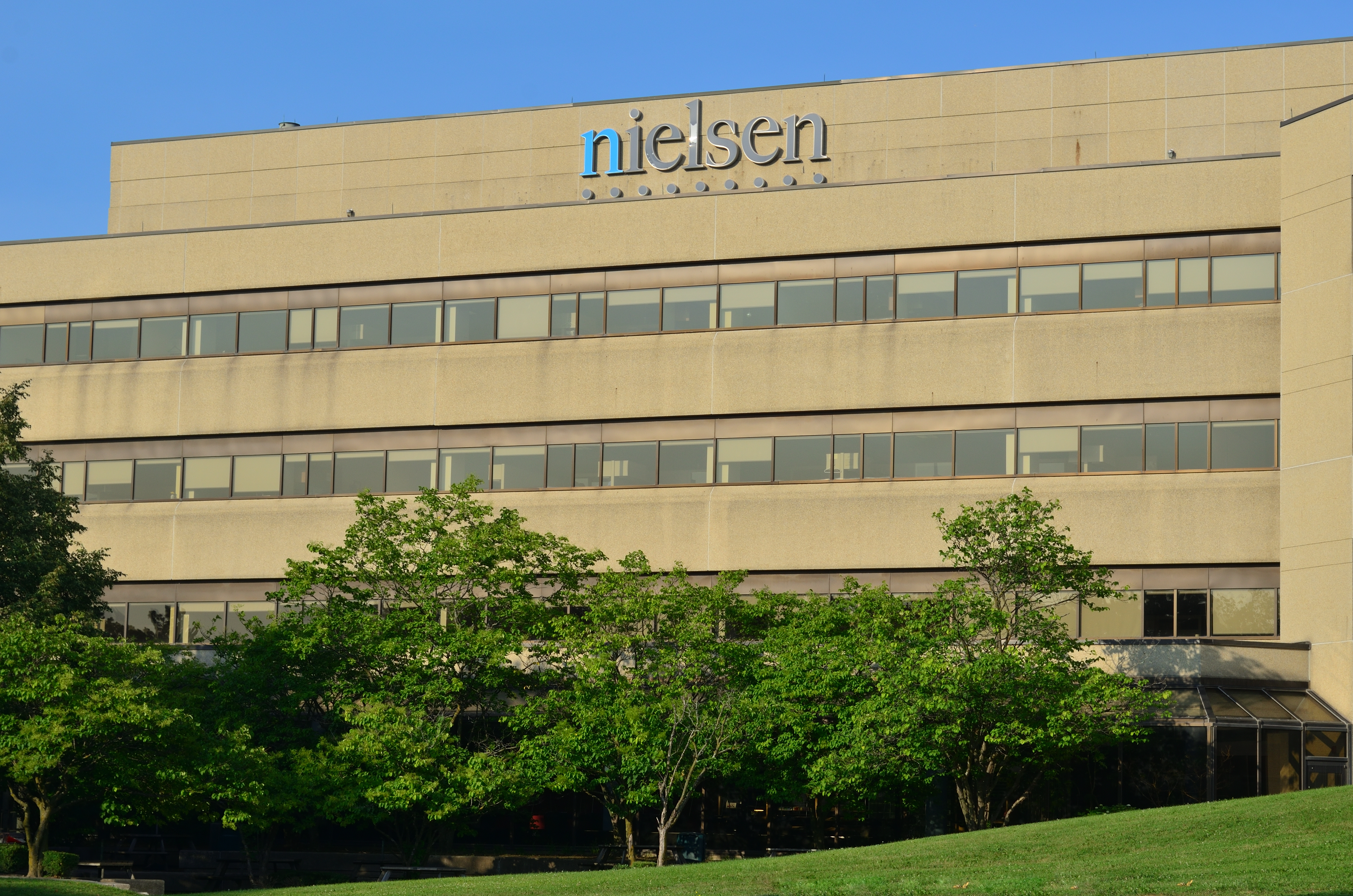
Nielsen office in Canada

Nielsen is a global, independent measurement and data company for media business. With a presence in more than 100 countries and services covering more than 90% of the globe's GDP and population, Nielsen provides clients with data about what consumers watch (programming, advertising) on a global and local basis and how those choices intersect.

The company's operations span developing and emerging markets worldwide, in more than 100 countries. According to SEC records, on February 26, 2015, Nielsen N.V., announced that its board of directors unanimously approved a proposal that resulted in a change in the company's legal domicile, from the Netherlands to the United Kingdom. Upon approval, the company became incorporated under English law and was registered as a public limited company to be named Nielsen Holdings PLC.

Up to 2022, James Attwood Jr. was Nielsen's non-executive chairman, who succeeded Dave Calhoun as Executive Chairman in January 2016. Prior to joining Nielsen as CEO in 2006, Dave Calhoun served as Vice Chairman of the General Electric Company and President and Chief Executive Officer of GE Infrastructure, the largest of six GE business units. He served as Nielsen CEO from 2006 to 2014, when he was succeeded by Mitch Barns. Barns joined Nielsen in 1997, and has held various roles in Europe, Asia, and North America leading major parts of the business.

On December 3, 2018, David Kenny was named CEO of Nielsen, succeeding Mitch Barns.

In September 2023, Karthik Rao was named CEO of Nielsen, succeeding David Kenny who became Executive Chairman.

While the Nielsen brand is most often associated with television ratings, those TV rating services comprise approximately one-quarter of the company's business and revenues. After substantial work to simplify the company over the last several years and divestment of NielsenIQ in 2021, Nielsen Holdings aligns its business into media audience measurement and analytics.

== Company history ==
=== Arthur C. Nielsen and the invention of "Market Share" ===
Arthur C. Nielsen founded the AC Nielsen Company in August 1923 with the idea of selling engineering performance surveys. It was the first company to offer market research. The company expanded its business in 1932 by creating a retail index that tracked the flow of food and drug purchases. This was the first retail measurement of its kind and for the first time allowed a company to determine its "share" of the market—the origination of the concept of "market share" Arthur C. Nielsen is credited with coining this business term.

=== Radio and television ===
In 1936, Arthur C. Nielsen acquired the Audimeter, which measured which radio stations a radio had been tuned to during the day. After tinkering with the device for a few years, the company created a national radio rating service in 1942. The company collected information on which stations radios were tuned to in one thousand homes. Then, this survey data was sold to manufacturers who were interested in the popularity of programs and demographic information about listeners for advertising purposes. This was the birth of audience measurement that would become the most well-known part of Nielsen's business when applied to television. Today, these are commonly referred to as "Nielsen ratings".

The company began measuring television audiences in 1950, at a time when the medium was just getting off the ground. Just as with radio, a sampling of homes across the U.S. was used to develop ratings. This information was collected on a device that was attached to a television that recorded what was being watched. In 1953, the company began sending out diaries to a smaller sample of homes ("Nielsen families") within the survey to have them record what they had watched. This data was put together with information from the devices. This combination of data allowed the company to statistically estimate the number of Americans watching TV and the demographic breakdown of viewers. This became an important tool for advertisers and networks.

In the 1980s, the company launched a new measurement device known as the "people meter". The device resembles a remote control with buttons for each individual family member and extras for guests. Viewers push a button to signify when they are in the room and push it again when they leave, even if the TV is still on. This form of measurement was intended to provide a more accurate picture of who was watching and when.

In July 2008, Nielsen released the first in a series of quarterly reports, detailing video and TV usage across the 'three screens' – Television, Internet and Mobile devices. The A2/M2 Three Screen Report also includes trends in timeshifted viewing behavior and its relationship to online video viewing, a demographic breakdown of mobile video viewers and DVR penetration.

On September 30, 2016, Nielsen made its Digital Content Ratings available in full syndication for clients.

On September 9, 2016, Nielsen announced that it would retire its paper TV diaries by mid-2017 and provide all electronic measurement in its local television ratings.

=== Private equity ===
Nielsen was acquired by the Dun & Bradstreet Company in 1984. In 1996, D&B divided the company into two separate companies: Nielsen Media Research, which was responsible for TV ratings, and AC Nielsen, which was responsible for consumer shopping trends and box-office data. In 1999, Nielsen Media Research was acquired by the Dutch publishing company VNU (Verenigde Nederlandse Uitgeverijen). VNU later acquired AC Nielsen and recombined the two businesses in 2001. In between, VNU sold off its newspaper properties to Wegener and its consumer magazines to Sanoma. The company's publishing arm also owned several publications including The Hollywood Reporter, Adweek and Billboard magazine. VNU combined the Nielsen properties with other research and data collection units including BASES, Claritas, HCI and Spectra. VNU also acquired companies that added to its measurement capabilities.

=== Becoming a public company ===
Nielsen was a private company from 2006 through 2011. On January 25, 2011, the company listed itself on the New York Stock Exchange and issued an initial public offering (IPO) that raised $1.8 billion in the largest private equity-backed U.S. IPO since 2006.

=== Mergers, acquisitions, strategic alliances and divestitures ===
==== 2004 ====
Nielsen began a joint venture called AGB Nielsen Media Research with WPP Group's AGB Group, a European competitor which provides similar services.

==== 2006 ====
VNU acquired a majority stake in Buzzmetrics, a company which measures consumer-generated media online. Under the new ownership, Nielsen bought the remaining shares of the company in 2007. In the same year, Nielsen acquired Telephia, which measures mobile media, and Bilesim Medya, a Turkish advertising intelligence firm. VNU was acquired by a group of six private equity firms: the American Kohlberg Kravis Roberts, Thomas H. Lee Partners, Blackstone Group, Carlyle Group and Hellman & Friedman, and Dutch equity firm AlpInvest Partners for £5bn. In the same year, the group hired David L. Calhoun, formerly of General Electric, as CEO. He renamed VNU as The Nielsen Company in 2007. VNU sold its business publications division for €320m (£210m) to venture capital group 3i, which then sold the UK division (VNU Business Publications Ltd) to Incisive Media.

==== 2007 ====
In June, Nielsen acquired Telephia, a provider of syndicated consumer research to the telecom and mobile media markets.

==== 2008 ====
Nielsen acquired IAG Research which measures viewer engagement with TV commercials. The same year, Nielsen made a strategic investment in NeuroFocus, a California firm applying neuroscience brainwave techniques for consumer research. The firm was later fully acquired by Nielsen in 2011 In 2009 and 2010, Nielsen sold its business magazines; its well-known entertainment properties went to the new company e5 Global Media.

==== 2009 ====
Nielsen acquired The Cambridge Group, a management consulting firm headquartered in Chicago. The firm researches latent and emerging consumer demand.

==== 2010 ====
In June, Nielsen paired with McKinsey & Company to create the social media consulting company NM Incite. NM Incite had operations in 13 global markets, including: US, UK, Germany, Spain, Italy, Australia, New Zealand, China, Japan, India, Brazil, Canada and Korea.

==== 2011 ====
In August, Nielsen acquired Marketing Analytics, Inc., which has historically helped companies measure their marketing plans’ impact by combining modeling with domain knowledge in software applications.

==== 2012 ====
In February, Nielsen launched The Demand Institute in collaboration with The Conference Board. The Demand Institute is a non-profit, non-advocacy organization. In July, Nielsen acquired the advertising tech company Vizu. The acquisition was made so that Nielsen can better analyze the effectiveness of online advertisement. In November, Nielsen acquired SocialGuide, a provider of social TV measurement, analytics and audience engagement solutions. On December 17, 2012, Nielsen disclosed that it would acquire Arbitron, a company primarily involved in radio audience measurement, for $1.3 billion. The successful acquisition was completed on September 30, 2013.

==== 2013 ====
On June 17, 2013, Nielsen announced that Onex Corp (TSX: OCX) had completed the acquisition of Nielsen Expositions for $950 million in cash consideration. Nielsen Expositions operated tradeshows in the United States. The company was renamed Emerald Expositions Inc. after the transaction.

==== 2014 ====
On February 3, 2014, Nielsen announced the acquisition of Harris Interactive, Inc. (NASDAQ:HPOL). This allowed Nielsen to take ownership of The Harris Poll. Later on February 26, 2014, Nielsen acquired Nexium, a retail in-store execution and sales analytics company. On September 18, 2014 Nielsen announced the acquisition of Indicus Analytics Pvt Ltd. On October 8, 2014, Nielsen acquired Affinnova, an international media and marketing research firm. The Affinnova team joins Nielsen's legacy BASES team to form Nielsen's Innovation Practice area.

==== 2015 ====
On January 22, 2015, Nielsen acquired Brandbank, specialized in the process of digitally collecting, managing and distributing FMCG product and brand image content for retail syndication across in-store, print promotional and e-commerce platforms. On March 4, 2015, Nielsen announced the acquisition of Exelate, a provider of data and technology to facilitate the buying and selling of advertising across programmatic platforms. On May 27, 2015, Nielsen acquired Innerscope Research, which specialized in consumer neuroscience using biometrics, eye tracking and facial coding. Nielsen renamed its combined offering as Nielsen Consumer Neuroscience, and named Carl Marci as Chief Neuroscientist.

==== 2016 ====
On March 3, 2016, Nielsen acquired Pointlogic, in marketing decision support systems. On March 10, 2016, Nielsen acquired Mumbai-based mobile usage measurer Informate Mobile Intelligence for an undisclosed amount. On June 21, 2016, Nielsen acquired Repucom, a sports measurement, evaluation and intelligence company based in Stamford, Connecticut. On December 20, 2016, Nielsen announced its agreement with Tribune Media Company to purchase Gracenote, a provider of media and entertainment metadata.

==== 2017 ====
On January 5, 2017, The Carlyle Group acquired Claritas from Nielsen. On January 20, 2017, The NPD Group acquired the US assets of Nielsen BookScan. On January 23, 2017, the Stagwell Group announced that it acquired Nielsen's Harris brand and the Harris Poll through its Stagwell Media LLC. On February 1, 2017, Nielsen completed its acquisition of Gracenote. On February 23, 2017, Nielsen acquired Rhiza, Inc., a Pittsburgh-based media and consumer analytics software firm.

==== 2019 ====
In December 2019, Nielsen music data business was sold to Valence Media (then parent company of Billboard, another former Nielsen business). The transaction includes Nielsen Broadcast Data Systems, Music 360, and Nielsen SoundScan.

==== 2021 ====
On March 5, 2021, Nielsen Holdings announced the completion of sale of Global Connect business (the former AC Nielsen) to private equity firm Advent International.

On July 8, 2021, Nielsen acquired TVTY, a TV attribution provider and ad monitoring company based in Paris, France, for an undisclosed amount.

==== 2026 ====
In 2025, the company announced its divestiture of business in South Africa, to take place by September 2026, permanently closing its Johannesburg office. Nielsen had furnished data for local industry, as well as the Broadcast Research Council’s Television Audience and the Radio Audience Measurement Surveys.

In August 2026, Nielsen Holdings agreed to buy DoubleVerify for about $2.15 billion.

=== Verenigde Nederlandse Uitgeverijen ===
Logo

Verenigde Nederlandse Uitgeverijen (VNU, literally "United Dutch Publishers", founded 1964) was a Dutch publishing company with products including European consumer magazines, Dutch regional newspapers, business publications in the European and North American markets, and educational publications.

In 1997, VNU acquired the directory publishing business of ITT Sheraton (ITT World Directories) for $2.1 billion; the business was renamed VNU World Directories.

VNU acquired Nielsen Media Research, part of the former AC Nielsen Company, in 1999. It was the owner of the Hungarian business magazine Figyelő in the 1990s.

In 2000, VNU acquired Miller Freeman, Inc. from United News & Media for a reported price of $650 million. VNU merged much of the purchased Miller Freeman assets into VNU Expositions. VNU subsequently divested themselves of a few former Miller Freeman assets.

VNU announced a heavy restructuring of its technology news portal, VNUNet, in February 2001. Ten employees were laid off due to the plan. The company disposed of its entire magazine publishing arm later in 2001 to Sanoma for €1.25 million, and sold its newspaper properties to Wegener. Focusing instead on market research and data collection, it acquired AC Nielsen in 2001, recombining the two halves of the former Nielsen business, and added other research and data collection units including BASES, Claritas, HCI and Spectra. In 2006, the company was acquired by a consortium of six investors for €28.75 per share, a sum of €7.5 billion. In the same year, the group hired David L. Calhoun, formerly of General Electric, as CEO.

In 2004, VNU World Directories was sold to Apax Partners and Cinven. VNU sold its business publications division in 2006 for €320m (£210m) to venture capital group 3i, which then sold the UK division (VNU Business Publications Ltd) to Incisive Media.

The company was renamed The Nielsen Company in 2007.

== Corporate affairs and culture ==
FIFA signed up with Nielsen to provide official market research for the 2017 FIFA Confederations Cup and the 2018 FIFA World Cup.

== See also ==
- NIQ
- Council for Research Excellence
