= The Demand Institute =

American non-profit think tank

- Type: Private
- Industry: Non-Profit
- Genre: Think Tank
- Founded: 2012; 14 years ago
- Founders: Mark Leiter, Jonathan Spector
- Headquarters: New York, New York, US
- Area served: Worldwide
- Key people: Mark Leiter (co-founder; Executive Chairman); Jonathan Spector (co-founder; Board Member); Louise Keely (President and Board Member)
- Parent: The Conference Board; Nielsen
- Website: www.demandinstitute.org

The Demand Institute is a non-profit think tank that focuses on understanding how consumer demand is evolving around the world. The Demand Institute was founded in 2012 by Mark Leiter and Jonathan Spector, and is jointly operated by The Conference Board and Nielsen and is headquartered in New York City.

== History ==
The Demand Institute initially focused on American Communities. The first report on consumer demand was The Shifting Nature of U.S. Housing Demand (2012). This was followed by A Tale of 2000 Cities: How the Sharp Contrast Between Successful and Struggling Communities is Reshaping America (2014).

More recently, the work has extended to China with the publication of "Sold in China" (2015), "No More Tiers" (2015), "A Wealth of Opportunity" (2016), and "The End of Cold, Hard Cash" (2016).

The Federal Reserve Bank of New York announced on January 13, 2014, that it was launching a new Survey of Consumer Expectations, which is conducted monthly by The Demand Institute.

The United Nations and the United Nations Foundation joined forces with The Demand Institute and Salesforce to launch Project 8, a global collaboration to help the world better anticipate the needs of 8 billion people in 2025 and beyond. The program was publicly announced in October 2014.
