= Jon Spector =

President and CEO of The Conference Board

Jonathan Spector is the former president and CEO of The Conference Board, and currently a senior advisor to the organization.

Spector, a graduate of Wesleyan University and Harvard Business School, joined The Conference Board after serving as vice dean of The Wharton School at the University of Pennsylvania. During his tenure at Wharton, Spector was responsible for the significant growth and strategic repositioning of the school's executive education activities, and for strengthening Wharton's involvement in book publishing, globalization and collaborations across the university. Before joining The Wharton School he spent 20 years with McKinsey & Company, where he was a senior partner in the firm. He serves on the board of directors of The Demand Institute, The Conference Board of Canada, and the March of Dimes Foundation. He is the co-author of We Are Smarter Than Me (2007), which highlights the ways in which businesses can harness the power of collective intelligence.
