= MIT Center for Collective Intelligence =

US research center

The MIT Center for Collective Intelligence (CCI) is a research center at the Massachusetts Institute of Technology, headed by Professor Thomas W. Malone, that focuses on the study of collective intelligence.

The Center for Collective Intelligence brings together faculty from across MIT to conduct research on how new communications technologies are changing the way people work together. It involves people from many diverse organizations across MIT including the MIT Media Lab, the MIT Computer Science and Artificial Intelligence Laboratory, the Department of Brain and Cognitive Sciences, and the MIT Sloan School of Management.

== History and mission ==
CCI was founded in 2006 by professor Thomas W. Malone. To a great extent, this is a continuation of the research Malone and his colleagues have conducted at the Center for Coordination Science, as well as within initiatives such as "Inventing the Organizations of the 21st Century."

The center's mission is to find novel answers to one basic research motif: "How can people and computers be connected so that—collectively—they act more intelligently than any individuals, groups, or computers have ever done before?"

In order to answer this question, the researchers conduct three types of research:

1. Collecting examples and case studies of collective intelligence applications
2. Creating new examples and tools that harness the collective intelligence of people
3. Systematic studies and experiments

Finally, they also work on developing theories to explain the phenomena of collective intelligence.

The center is sponsored by several corporates and non-profit organizations.

== Members ==
Professor Thomas W. Malone is the founder and director of CCI. In addition to Malone, the faculty steering committee includes: Professor Randall Davis (Research Director, Computer Science and Artificial Intelligence Laboratory, Department of Electrical Engineering and Computer Science), Alex (Sandy) Pentland (Toshiba Professor of Media Arts and Science and Director, Human Dynamics Group at the Media Laboratory), and Josh Tenenbaum - Paul E. Newton Associate Professor and Head, Computational Cognitive Science Group (Department of Brain and Cognitive Sciences).

The advisory board includes Tim Berners-Lee, Jimmy Wales and Alpheus Bingham (former CEO of Innocentive, Inc.). The center also has an active community of research scientists, students, scholars and other affiliates.
