= Jane E. Clarke =

English writer of children's books and poetry

- Clarke – England – 2010
- Born: Jane Elizabeth Clarke; 17 December 1954 (age 71); Kettering, Northamptonshire, England
- Education: University of Birmingham, University College London
- Occupation: Writer
- Known for: Author of children's books
- Spouse: Martin Clarke (deceased)
- Children: 2 sons
- Website: www.jane-clarke.co.uk

Jane Elizabeth Clarke (born in 1954) is an English writer of children's books and poetry. Her best known books include Gilbert the Great illustrated by Charles Fuge, and Neon Leon illustrated by Britta Teckentrup. Jane has published more than 80 books, including the Dr. Kittycat series for Oxford University Press, and children's reading scheme books used in schools. CBeebies Bedtime Stories have featured two of Jane's books, Stuck in the Mud (read by Dolly Parton) and Knight Time (read by Jake Wood). Stuck in the Mud is also featured with a US Scholastic Book Club edition, which includes a CD audio edition. This audio edition is produced by Beatstreet Productions, NYC, directed by Cheryl Smith, read by Cassandra Morris and features music composed by Michael Abbott.

Jane Clarke is also a team writer on three different popular series for young readers. Dinosaur Cove (series created by Working Partners Ltd. and published by Oxford University Press), Puddle the Naughtiest Puppy (series created by Working Partners Ltd and published by Ladybird Books Ltd) and Pet Hotel (created by Random House Children's Books and published by Red Fox).

== Early life ==
Clarke was born 17 December 1954 and was brought up in Kettering, Northamptonshire, England. Her parents were Jim and June Andrew. Jane was a pupil at Hawthorn Road County Primary School in Kettering. In 1972, she completed her secondary study at the Kettering High School for Girls. From 1972 to 1975, she studied at the University of Birmingham, where she earned a combined Bachelor of Arts with honours in archaeology and history. In 1981, she completed a PhD in archaeology from University College London.

== Awards ==
- Sheffield Children's Book Award – Picture Book Category (Gilbert the Great) 2006, Highly Commended
- Norfolk Library and Information Service Children's Book Award – Younger Category (Gilbert the Great) 2006, Bronze Star Winner
- Nottingham Children's Book Award for 3-5's (Stuck in the Mud) 2008

== Works ==
- Plodney Creeper, Supersloth (2001, ISBN 978-0-7497-4585-1)
- Sherman Swaps Shells (2001, ISBN 978-0-431-02408-0)
- Only Tadpoles Have Tails (2002, ISBN 978-0-09-943870-0)
- Smoky Dragons (2002, ISBN 978-0-8167-7457-9)
- Tusk Trouble (2003, ISBN 978-0-340-87725-8)
- Dino Dog (2004, ISBN 978-0-552-55032-1)
- Gilbert the Great (2005, ISBN 978-1-4027-2169-4)
- The Amazing Adventures of Batbird (2005, ISBN 978-0-00-718637-2)
- Prince Albert's Birthday (2005, ISBN 978-0-19-845579-0)
- I'm Not Wearing That! (2005, ISBN 978-0-19-845554-7)
- Dippy's Sleepover (2006, ISBN 978-0-7641-3425-8)
- Chewy Hughie (2006, ISBN 978-0-00-718692-1)
- No Nits! (2006, ISBN 978-0-7534-1289-3)
- Squeaky Clean (2006, ISBN 978-0-7496-6805-1)
- Mole and the New Hole (2006, ISBN 978-0-00-723600-8)
- Muck it Up! (2006, ISBN 978-0-00-723583-4)
- Trumpet: the Little Elephant with a Big Temper (2006, ISBN 978-1-4169-0482-3)
- Scratching’s Catching! [USA version of No Nits!] (2007, ISBN 978-0-7534-5958-4)
- G.E.M. (2007, ISBN 978-0-09-948012-9)
- Gilbert in Deep (2007, ISBN 978-1-4027-5125-7)
- The Best of Both Nests (2007, ISBN 978-0-8075-0668-4)
- Stuck in the Mud (2008, ISBN 978-0-8027-9758-2)
- Runny Honey (2008, ISBN 978-0-7787-3862-6)
- Knight Time (2008, ISBN 978-1-86230-536-6)
- Eye, Eye Captain! (2008, ISBN 978-1-4048-4906-8)
- Gilbert the Hero (2010, ISBN 978-1-84738-292-4)
- Creaky Castle (illustrated by Christyan Fox), Simon & Schuster, 2011
- Dance Together Dinosaurs (illustrated by Lee Childish) Random House, 2012
- How to Tuck In Your Sleepy Lion (illustrated by Georgie Birkett), Random House, 2015
- How to Feed Your Cheeky Monkey (illustrated by Georgie Birkett), Random House, 2015
- How to Brush Your Teeth With Snappy Croc (illustrated by Georgie Birkett), Random House, 2015
- How to Bath Your Little Dinosaur (illustrated by Georgie Birkett), Random House, 2015
- Old Macdonald's Things That Go (illustrated by Migy Blanco), Nosy Crow, 2015
- Who Woke the Baby? (illustrated by Charles Fuge), Nosy Crow, 2015
- I Saw Anaconda (illustrated by Emma Dodd), Nosy Crow, 2016
- Neon Leon (illustrated by Britta Teckentrup), Nosy Crow, 2017
- Firefly Home (illustrated by Britta Teckentrup), Nosy Crow, 2018
- Leap Frog (illustrated by Britta Teckentrup), Nosy Crow, 2019
- Tiptoe Tiger (illustrated by Britta Teckentrup), Nosy Crow, 2021

The Dr. KittyCat books, Oxford University Press:

- Dr KittyCat is Ready to Rescue: Posy the Puppy, 2015
- Dr KittyCat is Ready to Rescue: Daisy the Kitten, 2015
- Dr KittyCat is Ready to Rescue: Clover the Bunny, 2015
- Dr KittyCat is Ready to Rescue: Willow the Duckling, 2015
- Dr KittyCat is Ready to Rescue: Nutmeg the Guinea Pig, 2016
- Dr KittyCat is Ready to Rescue: Pumpkin the Hamster, 2017
- Dr KittyCat is ready to rescue: Peanut the Mouse, 2018
- Dr KittyCat is Ready to Rescue: Ginger the Kitten, 2018
- Dr KittyCat is ready to rescue: Logan the Puppy, 2018
- Dr KittyCat is ready to rescue: Bramble the Hedgehog, 2019

Al's Awesome Science, Five Quills:

- Al's Awesome Science: No.1: Egg-Speriments! (illustrated by James Brown), 2017
- AL's Awesome Science: Splash Down! (illustrated by James Brown), 2018
- Al's Awesome Science: Blast-Off! (illustrated by James Brown), 2018
- Al's Awesome Science: Busy Bodies! (illustrated by James Brown), 2019

Sky Private Eye, Five Quills:

- Sky Private Eye and the Case of the Runaway Biscuit: A Fairytale Mystery Starring the Gingerbread Boy, Five Quills, 2018
- Sky Private Eye and The Case of the Sparkly Slipper: A Fairytale Mystery Starring Cinderella, Five Quills, 2018
- Sky Private Eye and the Case of the Missing Grandma: A Fairy-Tale Mystery Starring Little Red Riding Hood, Five Quills, 2020

Lottie Loves Nature, Five Quills:

- Lottie Loves Nature: Frog Frenzy, illustrated by James Brown, Five Quills 2020
- Lottie Loves Nature: Bird Alert, illustrated by James Brown, Five Quills, 2021
- Lottie Loves Nature: Bee-Ware, illustrated by James Brown, Five Quills, 2021

In conjunction with Random House Children's Books (The Battersea Dogs & Cats Home Series):

- Rusty's Story: Battersea Dogs & Cats Home (2010, ISBN 978-1-84941-124-0)
- Misty's Story: Battersea Dogs & Cats Home (2010, ISBN 978-1-84941-180-6)
- Daisy's Story: Battersea Dogs & Cats Home (2010, ISBN 978-1-84941-179-0)

In conjunction with Working Partners Ltd. (Dinosaur Cove Series):

- Attack of the Lizard King: Dinosaur Cove 1 (as Rex Stone, 2008, ISBN 978-0-19-272092-4)
- March of the Armoured Beasts: Dinosaur Cove 3 (as Rex Stone, 2008, ISBN 978-0-19-272094-8)
- Catching the Speedy Thief: Dinosaur Cove 5 (as Rex Stone, 2008, ISBN 978-0-19-272096-2)
- Rescuing the Plated Lizard: Dinosaur Cove 7 (as Rex Stone, 2008, ISBN 978-0-19-272836-4)
- Tracking the Gigantic Beast: Dinosaur Cove 9 ( as Rex Stone, 2009, ISBN 978-0-19-272894-4)
- Finding the Deceptive Dinosaur: Dinosaur Cove 11 (as Rex Stone, 2009, ISBN 978-0-19-272896-8)
- Journey to the Ice Age: Dinosaur Cove Double Length Edition (as Rex Stone, 2009, ISBN 978-0-19-272927-9)
- Clash of the Monster Crocs: Dinosaur Cove 14 (as Rex Stone, 2010, ISBN 978-0-19-272977-4)
- Rampage of the Hungry Giants: Dinosaur Cove 15 (as Rex Stone, 2010, ISBN 978-0-19-272978-1)
- Battle of the Giants: Dinosaur Cove World Book Day Edition (as Rex Stone, 2010, ISBN 978-0-9562877-3-1)
- Swarm of the Fanged Lizards: Dinosaur Cove 17 (as Rex Stone, 2011, ISBN 978-0-19-278988-4)
- Stalking the Fanned Predator: Dinosaur Cove 19 (as Rex Stone, 2011)

In Conjunction with Working Partners Ltd. (Puddle the Naughtiest Puppy Series):

- Toyshop Trouble: Puddle the Naughtiest Puppy 2 (as Hayley Daze, 2010, ISBN 978-1-4093-0328-2)
- Rainforest Hide and Seek: Puddle the Naughtiest Puppy 4 (as Hayley Daze, 2010, ISBN 978-1-4093-0330-5)
- Magic Mayhem: Puddle the Naughtiest Puppy 6 (as Hayley Daze, 2010, ISBN 978-1-4093-0332-9)
- Animal Antics: Puddle the Naughtiest Puppy 8 (as Hayley Daze, 2010, ISBN 978-1-4093-0403-6)
- Star of the School: Puddle the Naughtiest Puppy 10 (as Hayley Daze, 2011 ISBN 978-1-4093-0406-7)

== Organisations ==
- Society of Children's Book Writers and Illustrators' Group (British SCWBI)
- Deal Writers
- British Humanist Association
- Wildwood Trust
