= Jane Clarke (milliner) =

Jane Clarke (1794–1859) was an English lace merchant and milliner.

A known milliner of her day and exhibitor at major exhibitions, she is known for mentoring the famous court dressmaker Madame Elise and the lace merchant Anthony Blackborne, each of whom took over a part of her business in 1859.

== Biography ==
Jane Clarke was born to a merchant family in London that traded in a wide range of luxury items. By 1840 she had her own shop at the 154 Regent Street in the West End of London, where she sold lace and silk, textiles often used for dress and furnishing. Her shop, strategically located in a fashionable part of the city, catered to the upper class and became lucrative, making it possible for her to expand and found shops in Manchester and Liverpool.

She expanded her business from luxury trade to include dressmaking, which was a natural development since she sold textile and trimmings often used for dresses, and she was listed as a lace dealer and dressmaker at 170 Regent Street at the 1851 London census. As a milliner, a title at the time used to describe a designer and maker of women's dresses, she had a staff of fifteen milliners and thirty-one, including eight shop and workroom assistants.

In 1859, Jane Clarke retired, and sold her trading business to the lace merchant Anthony Blackborne, and her milliner business to one of her milliner employees, Elise Jaeger (1836–1913). Clarke died later the same year.
