= Council for Research Excellence =

Privately owned business think-tank

The Council for Research Excellence (CRE) was an independent research group created in 2005 and funded by Nielsen, with a mandate to advance the knowledge and practice of audience measurement methodology. It was shut down in 2017.

The CRE identified specific methodological research projects, selected research providers and reported the findings to Nielsen's client base. The organization had numerous working committees including: Big Data, Digital Research, Education, Local Measurement, Media Consumption & Engagement, Return Path Measurement, ROI, Sample Quality and Social Media. CRE was headquartered in New York City.

The CRE was composed of senior-level industry researchers representing advertisers, broadcast networks, basic cable networks, broadcast syndication companies, local television stations and industry trade associations. CRE members represented a broad cross-section of companies such as NBC Universal, Univision, CBS Corporation, Turner Broadcasting System, Inc., Radio Advertising Bureau, and National Association of Broadcasters.

The CRE conducted studies to examine different types of video usage in natural settings and to improve measurement quality, such as Big Data Primer, Acceleration Ethnography Study, Talking Social TV, cross-cultural research using qualitative techniques, and CRE guide for validating new and modeled audience data.
