= Coalition for Innovative Media Measurement =

U.S. trade group

- Type: Coalition
- Industry: Advertising and Media Measurement
- Founded: 2009
- Headquarters: New York City
- Website: cimm-us.org

The Coalition for Innovative Media Measurement (CIMM) is a trade group, founded in 2009, by television content providers, media agencies and advertisers to explore ways to measure audiences across media in the United States.

== Initiatives ==
CIMM's initiatives are related to the goals of improving television measurement through return path data and cross-platform video measurement. CIMM provides its findings to members for an exclusive time, and then makes the findings available publicly.

=== Asset identification ===
On April 18, 2013, CIMM, Ad-ID, the industry standard for identifying advertising assets (broadcast, print and digital) across all media platforms, and EIDR, a universal unique identifier system for movie and television assets, announced results of a two-year initiative for a universal identifier, for professional video content and advertising. Nearly 30 media companies, advertisers and media research vendors participated in the initiative.

Groundwork for the trackable asset cross-platform identification (TAXI) initiative began in 2011, when CIMM hired Ernst & Young for studies and tests simulating, how open-standard asset registries – specifically, Ad-ID and EIDR – could be adopted within content and advertising supply-chains. The goal was to determine its benefits technical and operational feasibility.

Before the end of 2013, CIMM begin registering all newly created video assets with the EIDR and Ad-ID registries

=== SMPTE collaboration ===
In the summer of 2013, CIMM began working with the Society of Motion Picture and Television Engineers (SMPTE) on a standard to bind identifiers from Ad-ID and EIDR to video assets. The two organizations formed a study group, composed of leading media and advertising companies and engineers.

=== Video data warehouse ===
On June 19, 2013, CIMM released a Request for Proposals (RFP) to design, build and maintain a “Data Warehouse” of video viewing behavior across platforms, beginning with digital video programming data, that would be accessible by any participating organization. This centralized location would allow for the contribution and licensing of data necessary for improved cross-platform measurement and media planning and buying.

CIMM seeks industry-wide support for this initiative and collaborates with the Cabletelevision Advertising Bureau (CAB) and the Media Rating Council (MRC). The organization also interacts with other companies and organizations to increase participation.

=== Pilot tests ===
In February 2011, CIMM announced it was working with Arbitron and comScore on two independent, "proof-of-concept" pilot tests to measure three-screen users and their behavior with content and advertising across television, Internet and mobile. This initiative marked the first time that mobile Internet usage – including mobile video and apps – would be measured in "single source" cross-platform studies. The ultimate success of these two separate tests laid the foundation for what would become “Project Blueprint” – a collaboration between Arbitron, comScore and CIMM member ESPN for a measurement initiative for video, audio and display content across radio, television, PCs, smartphones and tablets.

=== Lexicon ===
Through interviews with over 60 technical executives involved in extracting and analyzing television return path viewing data, media consultant Charlene Weisler updated the original 2010 CIMM Lexicon from 800 terms to over 1400 terms that cover advertising and television applications, including Connected TV, Interactive TV, Dynamic Ad Insertion, Automatic Content Recognition and other online technologies. The Lexicon can be accessed on CIMM's website.

=== USA TouchPoints ===
On August 10, 2010, CIMM announced it was bringing the "TouchPoints" initiative, began in 2006 in the United Kingdom, to the United States. This research project – based on the U.K. Institute of Practitioners in Advertising's TouchPoints service and licensed by the Media Behavior Institute (MBI), was fielded by MBI in partnership with GfK MRI. IPA TouchPoints provided the media industry in the U.K. media planning data, across media including TV, radio, print, online and mobile.

The project included a sample of 1000 men and women aged 18–54 drawn from respondents who completed GfK MRI's widely used "Survey of the American Consumer," and employed eDiaries in which participants recorded their media behavior at 30-minute intervals over 10 days. That data was fused with existing media measurement services. This "hub and fusion" approach to cross-platform media measurement provides a time-based way of understanding consumers' media behavior. The study ran from September 2010 to February 2011.

On August 16, 2011, GfK MRI and Nielsen announced they made equity investments in MBI, supporting USA TouchPoints.

On September 29, 2011, the Media Behavior Institute announced that it had formally begun rolling out USA TouchPoints. ESPN signed on as the Charter Subscriber.

== Organization ==
Jane Clarke from Time Warner was named managing director in December 2009 and added CEO to her title in 2015.

=== Jane Clarke ===
Jane Clarke is the Managing Director of the CIMM.

Clarke spent more than 30 years in the media industry measuring and analyzing the behavior of consumers. Prior to joining CIMM, Clarke was at Time Warner where she led media measurement initiatives. She was also a co-chair of the Advertising Research Foundation’s 360 Media & Marketing Super Council and worked on the Council for Research Excellence’s Video Consumer Mapping Study.
