= Truvo =

Belgian local search and advertising company

- Company type: Yellow Pages directory
- Industry: Local Search and Advertising
- Headquarters: Antwerp, Belgium
- Key people: Donat Rétif (CEO)
- Products: Gouden Gids, Golden Pages, Pages d'Or
- Number of employees: ca. 490
- Website: info.truvo.com

Truvo (formerly World Directories and Promedia) is a Belgian company specialising in local search and advertising. Its products include Yellow Pages websites and print directories.

== Overview ==
Truvo, formerly World Directories, is a Belgian yellow pages business operating in the local search and advertising market and has around 500 employees. The print and online platforms are monthly used by more than 10 million people. Truvo offers a range of complementary services, in print, on-line, telephony and mobile.

== Debt Restructuring ==
In July 2010 Truvo entered Chapter 11 bankruptcy protection . In December 2010 it emerged from this process with a greatly reduced debt and lower costs . The company was then taken over by its former owner's banks . The company's revenues however continue to fall and there is no plan to pay off the remaining 475mio debt .

== Further debt problems and restructuring ==
In December 2011 Standard and Poor's lowered its credit rating on Truvo because of its debt burden and declining business performance. It also predicted a credit default sometime in 2012; according to S&P this would amount to bankruptcy and reorganisation as a going concern .

At the same time Truvo, announced the sale of its Irish operating unit to a Baltic company and the departure of all top executives except the CEO .

== Further restructuring and sell-off ==
In 2011, Truvo sold its Irish operations. In late 2012 Truvo quietly sold off its Portuguese and South African interests; no press releases or external communications were issued apart from some references on the corporate website. At the same time, Moodys and Standard and Poors both maintain a pessimistic view of the company's prospects . They state that the company's covenant test waivers will expire in early 2013. This can lead to a credit event triggering a default scenario like in 2010. In such a case the company could be declared bankrupt and reorganised as a going concern or possibly liquidated.

As of the time of writing its review site SaySo continues in operation but traffic remains at negligible levels.

Currently, it is debranding, reverting from using the Truvo name to its original name ( e.g. goudengids.be). Revenues for 2012 continue the falling trend and debt remains high .

Truvo has no longer any business operations outside Belgium. However, it still maintains a legacy software operation in Amsterdam, Netherlands even though all IT work is done in Belgium. The Amsterdam staff consists mostly of expat workers supporting, among others, the failed Sayso review website.

== Bankruptcy ==
Truvo declared bankruptcy in Antwerp on 29 June 2016 and parts of the activities of Truvo were taken over by FCR Media as a going concern with most jobs being saved. The Amsterdam subsidiary was declared bankrupt three weeks later with the loss of all jobs. Golden Pages in Ireland, which had already been taken over by FCR Media, went into bankruptcy protection one year later in July 2017.
