= Cambrian House =

Crowdsourcing software company

Cambrian House began as a crowdsourcing community that pioneered the technology to tap crowds for the best software ideas. To power open innovation in other businesses, they developed crowdsourcing platform Chaordix – the technology to harness a crowd for breakthrough ideas.

== Results ==
Launched in 2006, the original Cambrian House community attracted 50,000+ members and more than 7000 ideas from the crowd.

Weaknesses in the idea-community model included the challenge of convincing users to read and rate a rapidly growing pool of ideas, the relatively low quality of some ideas, the management complexity of distributed development, and the large number of duplicate submissions. These weaknesses have been successfully overcome by other companies including InnoCentive, IStockphoto, and T-shirt design company Threadless.

== In the news ==
Cambrian House has been discussed, primarily in relation to crowdsourcing in a variety of media including: CBC Radio's - The Current, The Financial Times and Economist Intelligence Unit, in addition to new media such as TechDigest and Mashable.

Cambrian House is also the subject of an eponymous Harvard Business case, which examines and discusses the concept of peer production, the crowdsourcing business model, and the possibility of using prediction markets to estimate market demand for products.

The company has also gained a degree of notoriety for its unconventional promotional efforts, including feeding 1000 pizzas to Google unannounced, auctioning a celebrity endorsed laptop for charity, and weighing a goat
