= Galidor =

Lego theme

- Galidor action figures
- Type: Action figures
- Invented by: Lego
- Company: Lego
- Country: United States
- Availability: 2002–03
- Materials: Plastic

Galidor is a discontinued Lego theme released from 2002 until 2003. Noted for its departure from traditional Lego bricks in favor of customizable action figures, the theme was poorly received and is credited in part for the financial failure of the Lego brand prior to Jørgen Vig Knudstorp becoming CEO in 2004.

== Overview ==
Inspired by the success of Bionicle in 2001, the Lego Group sought to create a new line of action figures that departed from the system of bricks for which the company had been known. During this period, the company produced a range of themes that did not focus on traditional Lego bricks, such as Znap, Primo, Scala, and Galidor. The Galidor line, first released in 2002, features customizable action figures with interchangeable pieces such as arms, heads, and legs. Galidor is similar to other action figure brands that were on the market on the time.

The line features 21 sets, five of which were available as Happy Meal toys from McDonald's. One toy in the series, the Kek Powerizer, includes playable video games and makes sounds when receiving signals from the tie-in television series. The voice lines of the Kek Powerizer were recorded by actor Brian Hamilton. Galidor has one cancelled set that was never released, which is a buildable toy motorcycle with shark parts called the Mokarr.

Due to a combination of factors, such as each set using expensive specialized parts, competition with Lego's own Bionicle series, and the unpopularity of the tie-in television series, the toy line performed very poorly and the Lego Group was close to bankruptcy by 2003. In 2004, Jørgen Vig Knudstorp became chief executive officer of the Lego Group. He ended production of unprofitable lines in favor of the brick-based building system that the company had previously produced.

== Tie-in media ==
In order to promote the Galidor line of toys, the Lego Group produced various forms of tie-in media such as video games for the Game Boy Advance, Microsoft Windows, PlayStation 2, and GameCube. Most notably, a live-action television series titled Galidor: Defenders of the Outer Dimension was produced at the same time the toy line was developed. Created by Thomas W. Lynch, the show lasted for two seasons. David C. Robertson, the writer of Brick by Brick: How Lego Rewrote the Rules of Innovation, said that the show was "stunningly bad" and "destroyed careers". The show was unpopular and sales for the toys diminished once it stopped airing.

== Reception and legacy ==
The Galidor line of toys and tie-in media performed very poorly. Lego designer Mark Stafford considers Galidor to be the Lego Group's biggest failure. Despite this, Galidor has remained popular among dedicated fans. Due to the line's status as a cult classic among Lego fans, it has been referenced in various modern Lego sets and series, including Lego Monkie Kid, Lego Ninjago, Lego Minecraft, a boutique hotel set, and the "90 Years of Play" set released for the Lego Group's 90th anniversary in 2022.
