= MIT Center for Information Systems Research =

Research center at the Massachusetts Institute of Technology

Coordinates: 42.363518°N 71.079037°W

- Abbreviation: CISR
- Formation: 1974
- Type: Research center
- Location: Cambridge, MA, US
- Director: Stephanie Woerner
- Website: cisr.mit.edu

The MIT Center for Information Systems Research (CISR) is a research center at the MIT Sloan School of Management founded in 1974. MIT CISR's research focuses on the use of information technology and management in complex organizations. Its mission is to "develop concepts and frameworks to help executives address the IT-related challenges of leading increasingly dynamic, global, and information-intensive organizations."

The Center for Information Systems Research has done groundbreaking research in the areas of managerial computing, executive support systems, critical success factors, IT governance, IT portfolio management, operating model, and enterprise architecture.

== History ==
The Center for Information Systems Research (CISR) was established in 1974 by the MIT Alfred P. Sloan School of Management. Its initial mission was described as: To conduct research on the effective use of computer-based information systems, and in particular concern itself with helping managers deal with questions of information system effectiveness. Among its first scientists were John F. Rockart, Norman Rasmussen, Peter Chen, John J. Donovan, Stuart Madnick, Henry D. Jacoby, Peter G.W. Keen, Charles B. Stabell, Steve Alter and Michael J. Ginzberg.

Over the years the Center for Information Systems Research has published a series of about 400 working papers, and has held many seminars and conferences. Together with other early IT research centers, such as the Management Information Systems Research Center at Minnesota (established in 1968), they helped to shape the young information systems discipline.

Professor Michael Scott Morton was the first director, from 1974 to 1976. The first long standing director of the Center for Information Systems Research was John F. Rockart, who managed the center from 1976 to 2000. He was succeeded by Peter Weill, who was succeeded in 2008 by Jeanne W. Ross. Stephanie Woerner has been director since 2022 and Peter Weill is currently the chairman of MIT CISR.

Other researchers and (former) faculty members associated with the Center for Information Systems Research are John F. Rockart, Dale L. Goodhue, Stuart Madnick, JoAnne Yates, Wanda Orlikowski, Peter Weill, Jeanne W. Ross, and Cynthia Beath.

== Selected publications ==
Working papers, a selection:

- Alfred P. Sloan School of Management, Center for Information Systems Research (1974) Statement of Purpose, Structure and Research Goals. Report CISR-1. Sloan WP 749-74 (1974)
- Keen, Peter G. W Information systems and organizational change CISR No. 55 Sloan VJP No. 1118-80 (1980)
- Dickson, Gary W; Rockart, John F. The role of information systems research centers CISR No. 62 Sloan WP No. 1158-80 (1980)
- Bullen, Christine V., and John F. Rockart. A primer on critical success factors. CISR No. 69. Sloan WP No. 1220-81 (1981).

Other publications:

- Rockart, John F., and Christine V. Bullen. The rise of managerial computing: the best of the Center for Information Systems Research. Dow Jones-Irwin, 1986.
