= Brick by Brick (disambiguation) =

Brick by Brick is a 1990 album by Iggy Pop.

Brick by Brick may also refer to:

- Brick by Brick (band), a hardcore/metal hybrid band
- "Brick by Brick" (song), a song by Arctic Monkeys from their 2011 album Suck It and See
- "Brick by Brick", a 2009 song by Katy Perry from her live album MTV Unplugged
- "Brick by Brick", a 2009 song by Train from their album Save Me, San Francisco
- "Brick by Brick", a 1997 song from the soundtrack of Lego Island.
- Brick by Brick: How Lego Rewrote the Rules of Innovation, a 2013 non-fiction book about the Lego company
- A slogan associated with the Bricks & Minifigs–Reckless Ben controversy

== See also ==
- "Brick by Boring Brick", a 2009 song by Paramore
