= MIS Quarterly Executive =

- Discipline: Business and management
- Language: English
- Edited by: Martin Mocker

Publication details
- History: 2002–present
- Publisher: Association for Information Systems
- Frequency: Quarterly

Standard abbreviations
- ISO 4: MIS Q. Exec.

Indexing
- ISSN: 1540-1960

Links
- Journal homepage

MIS Quarterly Executive is a quarterly journal covering the management of information systems. The journal was founded in 2002. Its purpose is to encourage practice-based research in the IS field and to disseminate the results of that research into a much more relevant manner to practitioners. It is a journal of The Association for Information Systems. It is based in Atlanta, Georgia.

== Editors-in-Chief ==
Sources:

- Jack Rockart (-2005)
- Jeanne W. Ross (2005-2008)
- Carol V. Brown (2009-2013)
- Dorothy E. Leidner (2014-2018)
- Gabriele Piccoli (2019-2022)
- Iris Junglas (2023-2025)
- Martin Mocker (2026-)
