= Galidor: Defenders of the Outer Dimension =

2002 science-fiction television series

- Promotional poster
- Also known as: Galidor
- Genre: Science fiction; Fantasy
- Created by: Thomas W. Lynch
- Based on: Galidor by The Lego Group
- Starring: Matthew Ewald; Marie-Marguerite Sabongui
- Voices of: Michael O'Reilly; Georges Morris; Walter Massey; Ian Finlay
- Countries of origin: Canada; United States
- Original language: English
- No. of seasons: 2
- No. of episodes: 26

Production
- Production companies: CinéGroupe; Tom Lynch Company

Original release
- Network: YTV (Canada); Fox Kids (U.S.)
- Release: February 9 – August 24, 2002

Galidor: Defenders of the Outer Dimension (commonly shortened to Galidor) is a science fiction television series created by Thomas W. Lynch and The Lego Group, and co-produced by CinéGroupe and the Tom Lynch Company in association with YTV. Galidor premiered on February 9, 2002, and ran for twenty-six episodes across two seasons, airing its last episode on August 24, 2002. It had limited reruns on other international networks. The series, based on the toy line of the same name, follows teenager Nicholas "Nick" Bluetooth and his friend Allegra Zane after they are transported to the Outer Dimension. Once there, Nick uses his newfound "glinch" shapeshifting ability to aid resistance efforts against the tyrant Gorm who has conquered the Outer Dimension in search of the hidden realm of Galidor.

The concept for Galidor as a toy line with an associated television series was created by the Lego Group, hoping to break into a new merchandise market during a period of financial trouble. The concept was brought to Lynch in 2000, who created the story and characters and initially planned out a five-season story arc. The series began filming in September 2001 at the Cine Cite studios in Montreal with a budget of US$16 million. The show combined practical effects and live actors with puppets and green-screen CGI. The series saw minimal attention, and mixed reviews both at the time and in retrospect due to its plot and focus on special effects. The franchise was a commercial failure, though the toys gained a cult following in later years.

== Plot ==
On his fifteenth birthday, Nicholas "Nick" Bluetooth−who lives a quiet life with his grandfather−finds a floating device in his room. Accompanied by his friend Allegra Zane, Nick discovers a ship called the Egg. Nick and Allegra are transported by the Egg to the Outer Dimension, a network of isolated realms currently controlled by the tyrant Gorm. In the Outer Dimension, Nick displays a shapeshifting ability called glinching, allowing him to transform his limbs into different mechanical or organic objects. Nick and Allegra are soon joined by companions who suffered due to Gorm's actions. They are Jens, a plant-like being preserved in a robotic form; Euripides, the last survivor of a genocide enacted by Gorm's forces; and Nepol, a warrior of the Siktari people. Nick also receives visions from Riana, queen of the hidden realm of Galidor and his biological mother.

It is revealed that the Egg was sent from the Outer Dimension by Nick's father Sam, who has been missing since his childhood. Known as the Stranger in the Outer Dimension and now presumed dead, Sam is blamed for a computer virus created by Gorm which destroyed navigation maps in the Outer Dimension; the device that led Nick to the Egg is the last map in existence. Gorm now wants to conquer the Outer Dimension including Galidor, seeking out Nick's glinch powers to ensure his victory. Nick was left on Earth to hide him from Gorm, who managed to steal a piece of his glinch abilities, before Galidor was sealed away by Riana.

The main storyline revolves around Nick and his allies finding fragments of the key to unlock the gates of Galidor, racing against Gorm and his agents while helping the people of the Outer Dimension's realms. One of Gorm's agents, the Galidorian Lind, defects to join Nick's cause so she can reach home again. Gorm ends up recovering the Key and unlocking the doorway to Galidor, prompting a confrontation where Nick apparently destroys Gorm. The series ends with Nick reaching Galidor and reuniting with Riana, while Gorm is revealed to have survived and is holding Sam hostage.

== Cast and characters ==
- Matthew Ewald as Nicholas "Nick" Bluetooth: a fifteen year-old who grew up without his parents, living a quiet life with his grandfather and dreaming of there being something more to the world. After coming to the Outer Dimension using the Egg ship, he unlocks the ability to "glinch", temporarily shapeshifting his limbs into the limbs of aliens and specialised machines.
- Marie-Marguerite Sabongui as Allegra Zane: Nick's best friend, a karate black belt and computer expert who holds a more practical outlook than does Nick. Initially frightened after she is dragged with Nick into the Outer Dimension, she ultimately sides with the resistance forces against Gorm.
- Michael O'Reilly as the voice of Jens: a master mechanic who maintains the Egg ship. Originally a plant-like being known as a Wexer from the realm of Wex, he was burned by Gorm, but his brain was preserved in a robot body. He is initially depicted with claw-like hands, which are later replaced with more articulate mechanical gloves. Jens is performed by Sam Magdi.
- Georges Morris as the voice of Euripides: Galidor's former Court Scholar, and now Nick's adviser. Euripedes is the last Amphibib, a sage frog-like species native to the formerly lush realm of Arbo wiped out by Gorm. He can use his staff to levitate individuals and objects via telekinesis and is capable of limited heat generation, though he prefers to use his knowledge and skills for more peaceful applications such as healing. Euripides's puppet form is performed by Jeffrey Hall.
- Walter Massey as the voice of Nepol: a warrior of the Yeti-esque Siktari people native to the snow-covered realm of Elta Siktar and a general in Galidor's army. Originally eight feet tall, he was shrunk to a small stature during Gorm's genocide against his species. He wields a luka, a spear-like weapon, can move at superhuman speeds, and can project ice or cold air at will. Nepol is performed by Claude Girous.
- Ian Finlay as the voice of Gorm: the main antagonist of the series. Gorm was once the chief advisor in Galidor's court but realized he would be unable to ascend to the throne and plotted a resistance out of jealousy towards Sam, leading to Riana banishing him from Galidor. He is a master illusionist who uses glinch powers stolen from Nick when Nick was still a baby to create his armies, intending to conquer the entire Outer Dimension, earning him the nickname "Conqueror of a Thousand Realms". Gorm is performed by Derrick Damon Reeve and later Steven P. Park.
- Karen Cliche as Lind: a recurring character and native Galidorian, she is introduced as an agent of Gorm being trained as his successor. She eventually defects to Nick's side out of a wish to return home.
- Randy Thomas as Dr. Samuel "Sam" Bluetooth, aka "the Stranger": Nick's long-lost father, who first constructed the Egg, traveled to the Outer Dimension, and fell in love with Riana, eventually marrying her and gaining a seat in the Galidorian council before Nick was born. He is first seen in the series falling into a chasm created by Gorm, presumably killing him, during one of Nick's nightmares. In the final scene of the series, he is shown to be alive and still being held hostage by Gorm.
- Tara Leigh as Riana: the Queen of Galidor and Nick's biological mother, from whom Nick inherited his autonomous glinching abilities. She communicates with Nick through visions due to sealing herself inside her home realm in order to protect it from Gorm.

== Production ==
During the late 1990s to early 2000s, Danish toy company The Lego Group were suffering from falling profits; while licenses for franchises such as Star Wars and the in-house Bionicle line proved profitable, at the time there was a market shift away from the style of brick building toys the Lego Group had designed up to that point. Intending to break into the action figure market, the Lego Group created a concept of figures with interchangeable limbs and an associated storyline. The intent was giving buyers both design freedom with the sets and an entertaining narrative. The Lego Group decided to create a television series to tell the toy line's story, and approached Thomas W. Lynch about the project in 2000; Lynch was well known in television for his work on multiple series aimed at the "tween" demographic. Lynch liked the concept, and worked together with the Lego Group designers to create what became Galidor: Defenders of the Outer Dimension, designing the story and characters based on the draft figure designs for the associated toy line.

The Galidor television series was co-produced by the Tom Lynch Company and Montreal-based CinéGroupe in association with Canadian channel YTV. CinéGroupe handled worldwide distribution in partnership with Columbia TriStar Intl. Television. The Lego Group held exclusive merchandise rights, collaboration on promotion and additional merchandise with United Media. Lynch and CinéGroupe president Jacques Pettigrew were executive producers, the production executive was Ken Katsumoto, Michel Lemire and Marie-Claude Beauchamp acted as series producers, and the lead director was George Mihalka. Mihalka directed several individual episodes alongside others including Jim Donovan and Giles Walker. The series cinematographer was Daniel Villeneuve, and Alan Best was CGI supervising director. The music, which combined electronic and techno with choral elements, was created by British composer Andrew R. Powell. Powell had worked on some of Lynch's earlier series.

When creating Galidor, Lynch wanted to combine a coming-of-age story with the "fun" of The Mummy (1999) and its sequel. Drawing inspiration from the Hero's journey concept, Nicholas was created as a character dealing with feelings of both personal and social isolation. Tom Chehak acted as showrunner working from Lynch's draft, overseeing the scripts and music, alongside working with the various partners to keep the show in line with project goals. The episode scripts were written by a large team including Lynch, Chehak, Alex Epstein and Damian Kindler. Lynch had a rough story plan spanning five seasons totalling 100 episodes, with the intention being to film the first two seasons, break for a few months, then produce the third season. Ewald, who played Nicholas, had previously acted in supporting roles and Minnesota theatre with Galidor being his first lead part. In contrast, Allegra was Sabongui's debut as an actor, having only done work in school productions before. Ewald and Sabongui auditioned on the same day, which coincided with the September 11 attacks, and bonded both during the aftermath and while filming.

Active production on Galidor began on September 25, 2001. Filming took place at the Cine Cite studios in Montreal, both in practical sets and against green screens. The show's two seasons were given a combined budget of C$25 million (US$16 million). Each episode, allotted a budget of C$1 million (US$620,000), was filmed and completed over a few weeks. Lynch was eager to create a series that blended CGI with practical elements and live actors. The show also incorporated practical effects, full body costumes for characters like Gorm, and puppet characters with incorporated animatronics. Ewald and Sabongui performed many of their own stunts, while Gorm's stunts were performed by Derrick Damon Reeve. Roughly a third of the storyboards were dedicated to CGI, which involved extensive cross-checking between crews and the overlaying of up to four different graphical elements in some scenes. The amount of CGI was limited due to the budget, with Lynch and Best cooperating on finding camera angles that balanced CGI with sets and practical effects. Shooting was done using a single HD camera to minimize post-production work. During the last couple of months shooting, Lynch learned that Fox Family was being bought by The Walt Disney Company. This worried him, as he assumed the purchase was due to the commercially-successful Power Rangers franchise, and that Disney would not be interested in funding new series like Galidor. He also noted that Galidor shared copyright with the Lego Group rather than being an in-house property, further discouraging promotion from Disney.

== Broadcast ==
Galidor began simultaneous broadcast on YTV in Canada and Fox Kids in the United States on February 9, 2002 in the morning time slot. After its debut, the show was moved around to different slots. The original broadcast ended on August 24, 2002. It was the last original show to debut on Fox Kids before it was rebranded as FoxBox under new owners 4Kids Entertainment in September 2002. Also beginning in September 2002, Galidor was repeated on ABC Family. It was broadcast on Saturdays and Sundays. Galidor was one of the debut titles of a tween-focused programming block on Australia's Foxtel in May 2002, broadcasting on Sundays and Mondays. Originally scheduled for UK broadcast on BBC1 in January 2003, it was broadcast from February 16 to July 23 of that year on BBC2's early morning CBBC programming slot. The series was brought over by Theresa Plummer-Andrews, then an executive producer for CBBC and keen to bring in new international shows. Two versions of the theme song were created for the show; a 30 second version for broadcast in the United States, and a minute-long international version.

=== Episodes ===
==== Season 1 (2002) ====
No. overall	No. in season	Title	Directed by	Written by	Original release date	Prod. code
1	1	"Identity"	George Mihalka	Thomas W. Lynch	February 9, 2002	101
2	2	"Euripides, Please"	Giles Walker	Thomas W. Lynch	February 16, 2002	102
3	3	"All for One, One for Nepol"	Jim Donovan	Jonas Agin, Vijal Patel	February 23, 2002	103
4	4	"Bouncing off the Walls"	Giles Walker	Shari Goodhartz	March 2, 2002	104
5	5	"Dust til Dawn"	Giles Walker	Jonas Agin, Vijal Patel	March 9, 2002	105
6	6	"Belonging"	Adam Weissman	Chad Fiveash, James Stotereaux	March 16, 2002	109
7	7	"A Crack in the Map"	George Mihalka	Doug Cooney	March 23, 2002	107
8	8	"Seeing Is Just Seeing"	Giles Walker	Terry Saltsman	March 30, 2002	108
9	9	"Truth, Lies, and Videotape"	Jim Donovan	Alex Epstein	April 6, 2002	106
10	10	"Just Because You're Paranoid"	Adam Weissman	Alex Epstein	April 27, 2002	115
11	11	"Frozen Feud"	George Mihalka	Vijal Patel	May 4, 2002	111
12	12	"Relativity"	Jean-Claude Lord	Damian Kindler	May 11, 2002	116
13	13	"It's Deja Vu All Over Again"	Adam Weissman	Tom Chehak	May 18, 2002	112
14	14	"The Road to Kek"	George Mihalka	Tom Chehak	May 25, 2002	121
15	15	"A Room with No View"	Adam Weissman	Leila Bensen, Dave Preston	June 1, 2002	113
16	16	"Escape from Kek"	Adam Weissman	Alex Epstein	June 8, 2002	119

==== Season 2 (2002) ====
No. overall	No. in season	Title	Directed by	Written by	Original release date	Prod. code
17	1	"Pieces of Nick"	Patrick Williams	Tom Chehak	June 22, 2002	117
18	2	"A Tale of Two Nicks"	Roger Cantin	Laura Kosterski	June 29, 2002	118
19	3	"Go for the Bronze"	Patrick Williams	Jana Veverka	July 6, 2002	123
20	4	"State of the Art"	John L'Ecuyer	John Mandel	July 13, 2002	110
21	5	"The Great Glinch Switch"	Adam Weissman	Thomas W. Lynch, Jonas Agin, Vijal Patel	July 20, 2002	124
22	6	"Mr. Tager Goes to Earth"	Sean Dwyer	Therese Beaupre	July 27, 2002	125
23	7	"Area 51"	Adam Weissman	Erik Saltzgaber	August 3, 2002	122
24	8	"Remembering"	Tom Chehak	Tom Chehak	August 10, 2002	127
25	9	"The Gates of Galidor (Part 1)"	Giles Walker	Alex Epstein	August 17, 2002	120
26	10	"The Gates of Galidor (Part 2)"	Adam Weissman	Tom Chehak	August 24, 2002	126

== Reception and legacy ==
In April 2002, it was reported that the series had boosted FoxKids viewership within the show's target demographic. In their 2002 fiscal report, the Lego Group felt that the series had failed to attract the predicted popularity needed in the United States. The show was not a ratings success overall, which Lynch attributed to lack of marketing.

In a review for the Rome News-Tribune after its first few episodes aired, Evan Levine cited the special effects as Galidor's main attraction, otherwise finding the premise and characters unoriginal. He did see potential and positively noted its theme of alienation. The show was a runner-up in the 2002 Kidscreen Awards in the "Teen/Tween" category. Lynch remembered being shocked by critical and audience reactions to Galidor, which were less enthusiastic than with his earlier series.

In a Bloomberg News article about the Lego Group in 2010, Jay Green referred to Galidor as "a Saturday morning cartoon cliché" which was dismissed as a long commercial for the toy line. In 2013 David Robertson, then a practice professor at the University of Pennsylvania and co-author of a non-fiction book on the Lego Group, called the television series bad and felt it had negatively impacted the careers of its actors. As part of a 2021 article on the Power Rangers franchise, Paste Magazine's Dave Trumbor mentioned the show as one of several productions at the time that failed to gain an audience, stating they had "abysmally immature computer-generated graphics as stand-ins for suited monsters".

Different sources have blamed the failure of Galidor on issues caused by the purchase of Fox Family and consequent lack of publicity for the series, the television series being low quality, the Lego Group's lack of experience with television, and poor reactions to the toy line. Lynch described Galidor as a learning experience that informed his later focus on story over special effects.

In a 2012 interview with blogger AmyBeth Inverness, Matthew Ewald fondly recalled his time acting on the series and how it launched his career. Of the series' cult following, he commented: "…I am grateful that, to some, it is still thought of fondly…that it is still loved and enjoyed. That to those souls and adventurers — the Quest to free Galidor and save the Outer Dimension is still there. That it still means something. Because for me, I am a true fan of this project…no matter if I were a part of it or not."

== Other media and merchandise ==
=== Video games ===
As part of Galidor's promotion, a web browser game titled Galidor Quest was released through the project website. An adventure game played from a top-down perspective, the goal was for the player to create an Outer Dimension character and progress the story through combat and solving puzzles. Players could compete with each other in an online arena. The browser game was part of a mixed media promotional approach compared to later alternate reality games.

In December 2001, the Lego Group partnered with Electronic Arts to publish a video game tie-in based on the Galidor toys and series. The video game was split across two versions. The Game Boy Advance version was developed by Tiertex Design Studios, while Asylum Entertainment was developing a version for Windows, PlayStation 2 and GameCube. An unannounced Xbox version was rated 3 in August 2003 by PEGI. In May 2002, publisher Electronic Arts displayed the Game Boy Advance and PlayStation 2 versions at E3 2002. The Game Boy Advance version was released by Lego Interactive and Electronic Arts in North America on October 29, 2002. The game received a mixed reception, with reviews usually citing repetitive gameplay and unresponsive controls.

Asylum Entertainment's game, produced by Nick Ferguson, was developed under Lego Interactive's request for a "traditional" platform game themed around Nick's glinching abilities. It was initially scheduled for a release in early 2003, and in July 2003, Electronic Arts announced that would be released in September of that year. During this period, Asylum Entertainment staff saw the mixed reactions to the series and toy line, and were eager to get it finished and move onto a new contract. On September 3, 2003, Asylum Entertainment announced that, due to financial instability, they had cancelled their Galidor game for all platforms, and laid off the game's team. The unfinished Windows version ended up getting budget re-releases of individual Lego video games, or Lego video game bundles, released by Focus Multimedia (2004) and ValuSoft (2006) in Europe and North America, respectively.

=== Toys ===
Production of the toy line ran parallel with the series, led by senior Lego Group designer Niels Milan Pedersen. The design drew inspiration from a number of early concepts about evolving and merging creatures, with the specifics coming together following talks with Lynch. The Lego Group's marketing division at the time was pushing for the action figure approach, as it considered traditional Lego bricks to be no longer commercially viable. The Lego Group described Galidor as a new venture due to wanting to expand the merchandise and media beyond their traditional boundaries. Their plan was to launch the toys after the series had gained traction. One notable element of the crossover was the Kek Powerizer, a hybrid design combining the action figure elements with a rudimentary electronic device which would play sound clips based on both the parts attached to the Kek Powerizer body and the sound signals received from either the television series or video games. The Kek Powerizer's voice lines were recorded by Brian Hamilton.

Galidor and its associated theme was announced in early 2001. They also advertised the project through print adverts and a McDonald gift promotion. Bionicle comic writer Greg Farshtey created a tie-in comic for the theme, and a dedicated exhibition was created in Legoland theme parks showing off the toys and clips from the series. While those at the Lego Group's Denmark headquarters were having doubts about the line as the series and toy line neared release, the North American office remained enthusiastic and pushed for more figures to be produced. The designers only saw the series close to its broadcast, disliking it as a whole and being disappointed at the rubber suit style for many of the alien characters. The figures saw a limited preview release in March 2002, and a full retail release in July. They were at the time exclusive to the United States, with the plan being to launch them internationally to coincide with the show's overseas broadcast.

Sales of the toys were poor, and declined following the end of the series. The Galidor toy line was discontinued in 2002 leading to some sets being cancelled, with the Lego Group's stating they would abandon the action figure style going forward. The Lego Group later called Galidor the worst-selling toy line in their history, and it was blamed along with other factors for the company's near-bankruptcy in 2003. Pedersen later noted that the Lego Group were unwise to launch the Galidor line in direct competition with Bionicle. In the years since, the toys have gained a cult following among both fans and Lego Group designers. Pedersen recalled the line as "quite special" but let down by the marketing.
