= Znap =

ZNAP may refer to:

- ZNAP, a mobile business platform
- Lego Znap, a Lego theme that was produced from 1998–1999. It is similar to K'nex and can also be used to build objects in a frame-like way.
