= Jeanne W. Ross =

American computer scientist

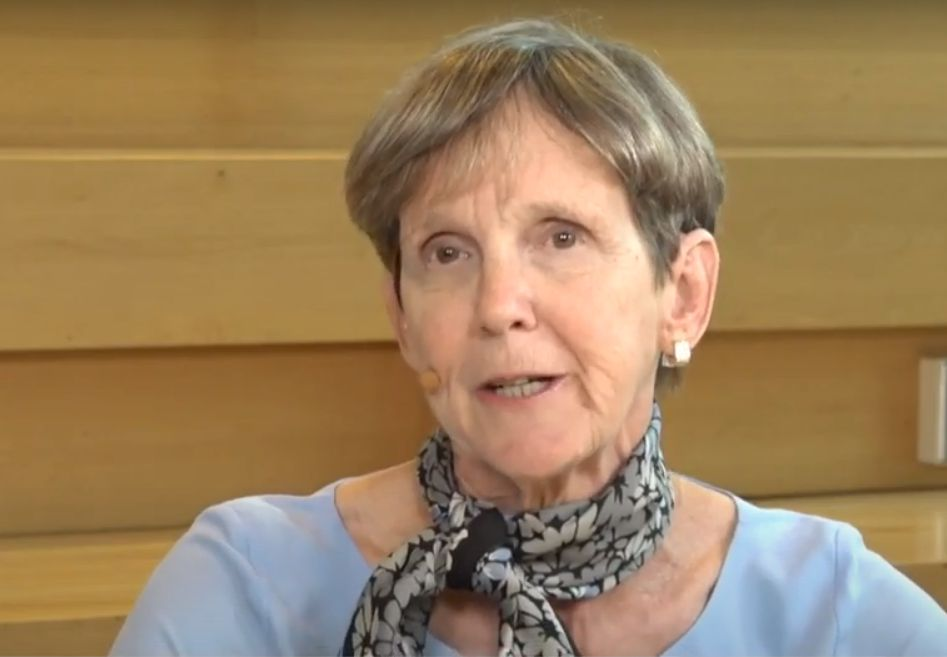
Jeanne Ross, MIT CISR at MIT CDOIQ 2019

Jeanne Wenzel Ross (born ca. 1952) is an American organizational theorist and principal research scientist at MIT Sloan School of Management and the MIT Center for Information Systems Research (CISR), specializes in Enterprise Architecture, ICT and Management. She is known for her work on IT governance, and Enterprise architecture.

== Biography ==
Ross received her BA from the University of Illinois in 1974, her MBA from the Wharton School of the University of Pennsylvania in 1977, and her PhD in Management Information Systems from the University of Wisconsin–Milwaukee in 1987 with the thesis, entitled "Management information systems department control over end-user computing in marketing departments" under supervision of Kate M. Kaiser.

After her graduation in 1978 Ross started her academic career as assistant professor at St. Norbert College. From 1989 to 1993 she was assistant professor at Worcester Polytechnic Institute, and then she joined the Boston University School of Management. In the early 1990s she wrote her first working papers with Janis L. Gogan. In 1993 she moved to the MIT Sloan School of Management, where she became principal research scientist at MIT Sloan School’s Center for Information Systems Research (CISR). She served as the Center's director from 2008-2016. In June 2020 she retired from MIT CISR.

In 2001 Ross was founding editor of MIS Quarterly Executive, and she was Editor-in-Chief for some time. Ross' research is focused on "how firms develop competitive advantage through the implementation and reuse of digitized platforms."

== Selected publications ==
- Weill, Peter, and Jeanne W. Ross. IT governance: How top performers manage IT decision rights for superior results. Harvard Business Press, 2004.
- Ross, Jeanne W., Peter Weill, and David C. Robertson. Enterprise architecture as strategy: Creating a foundation for business execution. Harvard Business Press, 2006.
- Ross, Jeanne W., Cynthia Mathis Beath, and Martin Mocker. "Designed for Digital: How to Architect Your Business for Sustained Success." MIT Press, 2019.

Articles, a selection:

- Rockart, John F., Michael J. Earl, and Jeanne W. Ross. "Eight imperatives for the new IT organization." Sloan management review 38.1 (1996): 43-55.
- Ross, Jeanne W., Cynthia Mathis Beath, and Dale L. Goodhue. "Develop long-term competitiveness through IT assets." Sloan management review 38.1 (1996): 31-42.
- Ross, Jeanne W., and Michael R. Vitale. "The ERP revolution: surviving vs. thriving." Information systems frontiers 2.2 (2000): 233-241.
- Robey, Daniel, Jeanne W. Ross, and Marie-Claude Boudreau. "Learning to implement enterprise systems: an exploratory study of the dialectics of change." Journal of Management Information Systems 19.1 (2002): 17-46.
- Levina, Natalia, and Jeanne W. Ross. "From the vendor's perspective: exploring the value proposition in information technology outsourcing." MIS Quarterly (2003): 331-364.

== Awards ==
- 2017, Fellow of the Association for Information Systems
