= Neil Ramiller =

American computer scientist (born 1952)

- Born: Neil Clifford Ramiller; 1952 (age 73–74)
- Education: Sonoma State University (BA); UCLA Anderson School of Management (PhD); University of California, Berkeley (MBA)
- Occupations: Computer scientist; academic

Neil Clifford Ramiller (born 1952) is an American academic, and Professor of Management at the Portland State University School of Business Administration, known for his work with Swanson, E. Burton on the management of information-technology innovations, particularly on organizing vision.

== Biography ==
After received his BA in Anthropology and Chemistry from Sonoma State University, Ramiller has done graduate work in anthropology and linguistics in the 1970s. Later in 1996 he received his PhD from the UCLA Anderson School of Management under supervision of E. Burton Swanson, and his MBA from University of California, Berkeley.

In the 1970s Ramiller had started his career in cultural resources management, doing both archaeological fieldwork and administration. In the 1980s he moved into the software industry, working in software development, documentation, administration and consultancy. In the 1990s he joined the UCLA Anderson School of Management. In the new millennium he was appointed Professor of Management at the Portland State University School of Business Administration.

Ramiller was part of the editorial board of the journals Information & Organization, and Information Technology & People, and was associate editor for MIS Quarterly. He has been member of the International Federation for Information Processing Working Group 8.2 (IFIP WG 8.2).

Ramiller was awarded for best paper published in MIS Quarterly in 2004; best published paper award by the Academy of Management OCIS Division in 2009; and best paper award by the Association of Graduate Liberal Studies Programs in 2009.

== Selected publications ==
Ramiller authored and co-authored many publications. Articles, a selection:

- Swanson, E. Burton, and Neil C. Ramiller. "Information systems research thematics: submissions to a new journal, 1987–1992." Information Systems Research 4.4 (1993): 299-330.
- Ramiller, Neil C. "Perceived compatibility of information technology innovations among secondary adopters: Toward a reassessment." Journal of Engineering and Technology Management 11.1 (1994): 1-23.
- Swanson, E. Burton, and Neil C. Ramiller. "The organizing vision in information systems innovation." Organization science 8.5 (1997): 458-474.
- Swanson, E. Burton, and Neil C. Ramiller. "Innovating mindfully with information technology." MIS Quarterly (2004): 553-583.
- Wang, Ping, and Neil C. Ramiller. "Community learning in information technology innovation." MIS Quarterly 33.4 (2009): 709-734.
