= E. Burton Swanson =

American information scientist

E. Burton Swanson (born 1939) is an American information scientist, and Professor Emeritus of Information Systems at the UCLA Anderson School of Management.

== Biography ==
Swanson received his BS in Industrial and Systems Engineering in 1962 from San Jose State University, his MBA in 1964 from the University of Michigan and his PhD in Business Administration in 1971 from University of California, Berkeley.

Swanson had started his career at IBM, where he worked in the system development of applications. He returned to the academia in 1974 to the University of California, Los Angeles, where he became Professor of Information Systems at the UCLA Anderson School of Management, where he directed the Information Systems Research Program. He has held visiting positions in England, Belgium and Germany.

Swanson was the founding Editor-in-Chief of the Information Systems Research from 1987 to 1992. In 1980 he also co-founded the International Conference on Information Systems (ICIS). In 2009 he was awarded the LEO award for exceptional lifetime achievement by the Association for Information Systems.

Swanson research interests are in the fields of Information Systems and Technology and Enterprise Systems, particularly Business Innovations and organizing vision; a term developed by Swanson and Neil Ramiller. His research is focused on "the life cycles of systems in organizations, addressing issues of innovation, implementation, utilization, and maintenance."

== Selected publications ==
Swanson authored and co-authored many publications. Books:

- Lientz, Bennet P., and E. Burton Swanson. Software maintenance management: a study of the maintenance of computer application software in 487 data processing organizations. (1980).
- Swanson, E. Burton, and Cynthia Mathis Beath. Maintaining information systems in organizations. John Wiley & Sons, Inc., 1989.

Articles, a selection:

- Swanson, E. Burton. "Management information systems: appreciation and involvement." Management Science 21.2 (1974): 178-188.
- Swanson, E. Burton. "The dimensions of maintenance." in Proceedings of the 2nd international conference on Software engineering. IEEE Computer Society Press, 1976.
- Swanson, E. Burton. "Information systems innovation among organizations." Management Science 40.9 (1994): 1069-1092.
- Swanson, E. Burton, and Neil C. Ramiller. "The organizing vision in information systems innovation." Organization science 8.5 (1997): 458-474.
- Swanson, E. Burton, and Neil C. Ramiller. "Innovating mindfully with information technology." MIS Quarterly (2004): 553-583.
