= Cambridge Technology Partners =

Japan-based multinational professional services company

Cambridge Technology Partners, Ltd.
- Industry: Business consulting, Technology, Outsourcing Services
- Founded: 1991; 35 years ago
- Headquarters: Tokyo, Japan
- Number of employees: 168
- Parent: Nihon Unisys, Ltd.
- Subsidiaries: Cambridge Technology Partners Inc. (located in Torrance, CA)
- Website: www.ctp.com

Cambridge Technology Partners (Japanese: ケンブリッジ・テクノロジー・パートナーズ株式会社, CTP) is a Japan-based multinational professional services company that specializes in business and IT consulting.

The company is known for facilitation-based consulting, focusing on bringing out a client's transformation mindset, deciding on realistic and acceptable goals, and overcoming the barriers between teams and departments. The goal is to enable clients to eventually lead their own transformation projects without relying on outside consultants.

== History ==
=== Early history ===
CTP was started as a division of Cambridge Technology Group. It was spun off and sold to Safeguard Scientific and others on February 23, 1991. The newly independent company named James Sims as CEO and Robert Gett as head of Technology and Consulting. Six months later, Safeguard bought out John J. Donovan.

CTP pioneered fixed time and price consulting service and Rapid application development (RAD), helping clients transform from mainframe-centric solutions to client-server architecture and packaged solutions.

In May 1993, CTP under the stock symbol CATP went public at $5 a share.

In 1999, it achieved peak revenues of $628 million, a market cap of ~$5 billion, and a global workforce of ~4000.

In 2001, Cambridge Technology Partners was acquired by Novell and became their e-services division. Novell felt that the ability to offer solutions (a combination of software and services) was key to satisfying customer demand. The merger was apparently against the firm's software development culture, and the finance personnel at the firm also recommended against it. The CEO of CTP, Jack Messman, engineered the merger using his position as a board member of Novell since its inception and soon became CEO of Novell as well. He then hired back Chris Stone as vice chairman and CEO to set the course for Novell's strategy into open source and enterprise Linux. With the acquisition of CTP, Novell moved its headquarters to Massachusetts.

=== Recent history ===
In 2006, CTP (Japan) was acquired by Nihon Unisys, Ltd.

In 2008, CTP became an independent company again following its spin-off from Novell. Serving the Swiss IT market, based in Nyon, Zürich, and Basel.

In 2014 CTP was acquired by Atos. Atos is a European information technology (IT) services corporation with its headquarters in Bezons, France, and offices worldwide. It specializes in high-tech transactional services, unified communications, cloud, big data and cybersecurity services.[3][4] Atos operates worldwide under the brands Atos, Atos Consulting, Atos Healthcare, Atos Worldgrid, Bull, Canopy, Unify and Worldline.

In 2019, CTP (Japan) reenters the US market as Cambridge Technology Partners Inc.

== Services ==
CTP's professional services are not tailored to a specific industry or function. The firm employs methodologies, frameworks, and a facilitative approach to define corporate and operational issues and find solutions that work for stakeholders.

- Business Transformation
- Management Strategy
- IT Strategy & Planning
- New Business Development
- Project Management Office (PMO)
- Professional Development

== Features ==
=== Facilitation consulting ===
Facilitation-type consulting is a style of consulting that helps customers transform themselves rather than providing solutions.

At Cambridge, consulting styles are categorized by "specialty provided" and "how to interact with customers" as follows. How to classify Cambridge consulting styles The teacher type makes proposals that make use of the expertise of the consultant, but it is up to the customer to realize the content of the proposal. On the other hand, in the solution type, the consultant introduces the solution. However, it is often premised on your own solution, so it may not always be highly compatible with the solution your customers need.

In addition, the analysis / proposal type proposes measures to solve problems tailored to the customer, but as with the teacher type, the consultant's involvement in realizing the proposal content is small.

On the other hand, the facilitation-type consulting that Cambridge advocates is a style that utilizes facilitation, which is generally known as a method of meetings, for consulting. This is an application of the facilitation's idea of "encouraging participants' involvement, eliciting independence, and focusing on overall consensus building" in the execution of the project. By having all stakeholders participate in the decision-making process, they will take the initiative in eliciting the attitude of being involved in the project.

=== Culture ===
At Cambridge, culture is clearly positioned as a source of competitiveness. He associates ideas and values with work styles and methodologies, and practices them in his daily work.

In particular, values (FROGBB, 6 core values) have taken root as employee evaluation criteria by subdividing them in light of actual behavior.

== Awards and recognition ==
- For six consecutive years, 2016–2021, selected as one of the Best Companies to Work For by the Great Place to Work Institute (GPTW) Japan
- Recognized as a Marketo Champion in Japan for "Marketing Team of the Year" in 2019.

== Published works ==
- Masaharu Shirakawa 『システムを作らせる技術 エンジニアではないあなたへ』（Nikkei, Inc. 2021 ）ISBN 4532323991
- Ryo Sakamaki 『ファシリテーション型業務改革 ストーリーで学ぶ次世代プロジェクト』（Nikkei, Inc. 2020 ）ISBN 4532323517
- Ryo Sakamaki 『世界で一番やさしい資料作りの教科書』（Nikkei Business Publications, Inc. 2019 ）ISBN 4296103946
- Masaharu Shirakawa 『リーダーが育つ変革プロジェクトの教科書』（Nikkei Business Publications, Inc. 2018） ISBN 4296101358
- Ryo Sakamaki 『世界で一番やさしい会議の教科書 実践編』（Nikkei Business Publications, Inc. 2018） ISBN 4822257223
- Ryo Sakamaki 『抵抗勢力との向き合い方』（Nikkei Business Publications, Inc. 2017）ISBN 4822238482
- Ryo Sakamaki 『世界で一番やさしい会議の教科書』（Nikkei Business Publications, Inc. 2015）ISBN 4822271781
- Masaharu Shirakawa『会社のITはエンジニアに任せるな! - 成功率95.6%のコンサルタントがIT嫌いの社長に教えていること』（DIAMOND, Inc. 2015）ISBN 4478067589
- Naohiro Seki and Masaharu Shirakawa『反常識の業務改革ドキュメント プロジェクトファシリテーション』（Nikkei, Inc. 2013）ISBN 4532319145
- Masaharu Shirakawa and Ryo Sakamaki 『業務改革の教科書 - 成功率9割のプロが教える全ノウハウ』（Nikkei, Inc. 2013）ISBN 4532319021
- Akira Kageyama『プロジェクトを変える12 の知恵 - ケンブリッジ式ファシリテーション - 』（Nikkei Business Publications, Inc. 2011）ISBN 4822262464
- Naohiro Seki and Masaharu Shirakawa『プロジェクトファシリテーション ～クライアントとコンサルタントの幸福な物語』（Nikkei Inc. 2009）ISBN 4532314712
- Cambridge Technology Partners『スピード会議のつくり方』（ASA Publishing Co. Ltd. 2005）ISBN 4860631153
