= Cynthia Beath =

American computer scientist

- Born: 1944 (age 81–82)
- Education: Duke University; University of California, Los Angeles
- Scientific career
- Fields: Information systems and information services
- Workplaces: McCombs School of Business.
- Thesis: (1986)

Cynthia Mathis Beath (born 1944) is an American economist and professor emerita at the Department of Information, Risk and Operations Management at the McCombs School of Business.

== Education ==
Beath obtained her BA in Psychology from Duke University in 1966, and later studied at University of California, Los Angeles, where she obtained her MBA in Computer and Information Systems in 1975, and her PhD in Computer and Information Systems in 1986.

== Career ==
Beath started her career in private industry, where she held positions in information systems development and in consultancy. She was appointed Professor at the Department of Information, Risk and Operations Management at the McCombs School of Business. She is also affiliated with the MIT Center for Information Systems Research.

Beath received a Fulbright Scholar award in 1993; a Decision, Risk, and Management Science Program (DRMS) Program Grant of the National Science Foundation in 1998; and an Advanced Practices Council (APC) grant from the Society for Information Management (SIM) in 2006.

Her research interests are in the fields of information system (development, implementation, management and maintenance) and information services, particularly the design of organizations and the management of vendor-client relationships.

Beath has served the Association for Information Systems since 1983, when it was still the ICIS Women's Breakfast. Her previous roles within the association includes Region 1 Representative, Vice President of Publications, and Vice President of Meetings and Conferences.

== Selected publications ==
Beath authored and co-authored many publications in her field of expertise. Books:

- Swanson, E. Burton, and Cynthia Mathis Beath. Maintaining information systems in organizations. John Wiley & Sons, Inc., 1989.
- Ross, Jeanne W., Cynthia Mathis Beath, and Martin Mocker. Designed for Digital: How to architect your business for sustained success. MIT Press. 2019.

Articles, a selection:

- Beath, Cynthia Mathis. "Supporting the information technology champion." MIS Quarterly (1991): 355-372.
- Ang, Soon, and Cynthia Mathis Beath. "Hierarchical elements in software contracts." Journal of Organizational Computing and Electronic Commerce 3.3 (1993): 329-361.
- Beath, Cynthia Mathis, and Wanda J. Orlikowski. "The contradictory structure of systems development methodologies: deconstructing the IS-user relationship in information engineering." Information Systems Research 5.4 (1994): 350-377.
- Silver, Mark S., M. Lynne Markus, and Cynthia Mathis Beath. "The information technology interaction model: a foundation for the MBA core course." MIS Quarterly (1995): 361-390.
- Ross, Jeanne W., Cynthia Mathis Beath, and Dale L. Goodhue. "Develop long-term competitiveness through IT assets." Sloan management review 38.1 (1996): 31-42.
- Ross, Jeanne W., Cynthia Mathis Beath. "Beyond the Business Case: New Approaches to IT Investment." Sloan Management Review 43.2 (2002): 51-59.
- Ross, Jeanne W., Cynthia Mathis Beath, Anne Quaadras. "You May Not Need Big Data After All." Harvard Business Review 91.12 (2013): 90-98.
