= Anthony triangle =

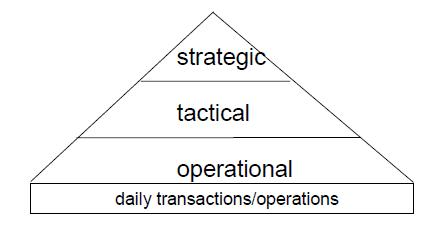
Anthony's Triangle

The Anthony triangle (also Anthony's triangle) is an organizational model. The triangle takes a hierarchical view of management structure, with many operational decisions at the bottom, some tactical decisions in the middle and few but important strategic decisions at the top of the triangle. The higher in the triangle an item is, the more scope it covers and less precise it becomes. As items move down they become more detailed and apply more precisely.

It came to the attention of the information systems community through the work of George Gorry and Michael Scott Morton.
