= Organizing vision =

Term defining how a vision is formed

Details
- Theory of: In terms of information systems innovation, how to from a vision of how to organize structures & processes.
- Origin: E. Burton Swanson; Neil Ramiller; (developed by)

General
- Applications: Interpretation; Legitimisation; Mobilisation; (Key Functions)

The organising vision (OV) is a term developed by E. Burton Swanson and Neil Ramiller that defines how a vision is formed, a vision of how to organize structures and processes in regards to an information systems innovation. It is defined as “a focal community idea for the application of information technology in organizations”.

Images and ideas about an innovation from a wider community are brought together. The vision can often be characterised by buzzwords such as ERP (enterprise resource planning) or CRM (customer relationship management). While these are often seen as hype, they can be useful in giving a title to an organizing vision.

The vision serves three key functions:

1. Interpretation:
  Explaining why the innovation exists and is relevant
2. Legitimisation:
  Giving reasons and supporting stories about why an organization should go for it
3. Mobilisation of economic roles and exchanges:
  Mobilizing the community and the information systems world to get involved – not just organisations, but journals, vendors, consultants, etc.

== Features of The Organizing Vision ==
- Emerges from discourse. This often starts off quietly, but becomes louder and richer as more actors become involved in the community.
- Is constructed by a heterogeneous social community who are united by the innovation but have different roles and interests. The ideas of structuration can be seen here in that while the organizing vision is shaped by the community, it also shapes the community. For example, organizations may ally who were united by being part of the community.
- OV has a relatively cohesive discourse because people within the information systems community share similar linguistic and ideological backgrounds.
- It has relate to the real economic world for it to be of any relevance. The problem of relating it to this world is called the business problematic.
- Is both constrained and enabled by technology.
- OV helps shape adoption and diffusion, and is in turn shaped as the innovation is adopted and diffused.
- It changes over time. It can lose or gain focus or overlap with other OVs. For an OV to attract interest, it must be distinctive, intelligible, informative, plausible and have some perceived practical value. Ultimately, it is forgotten as the innovation either fails or become unremarkable.
