= Michael Earl (academic) =

British academic

Michael John Earl
- Born: 1 November 1944 (age 81); Cheadle, Cheshire, England
- Occupations: Professor, Pro-vice chancellor, Consultant
- Years active: Since 1974

Michael John Earl (born 1 November 1944) is a British academic, Formerly Dean of Templeton College, Oxford, Pro-Vice-Chancellor of Oxford University, and Professor of Information Management in the University of Oxford, known for his work on strategic information systems planning.

== Biography ==
Earl was educated at the University of Newcastle upon Tyne (BA) and the University of Warwick (MSc). He is also a Master of Arts of the University of Oxford.

From 1974 until 1976 he was Lecturer in Management Control at Manchester Business School. From 1976 until 1990 he was a Fellow of Templeton College, Oxford, and founding Director of the Oxford Institute of Information Management. He then spent eleven years at London Business School, where he held positions including Professor of Information Management, Director of the Centre for Network Economy, Deputy Dean, and Acting Dean. During this time he remained an Associate Fellow of Templeton College.

In 2002 he became Dean of Templeton and Professor of Information Management in the University of Oxford. Until 2004 the President of the College was both Chairman of the Governing Body and Head of House. From 2004 Earl was Head of House. On 9 February 2005 his position was approved by The Queen-in-Council. He was also University's Chairman of Executive Education. As Dean of Templeton, he led a major restructuring of business and management studies in Oxford and then led the merger between Templeton College and Green College. In 2008 he became Pro-Vice-Chancellor (Development and External Affairs) of the university and oversaw most of the active phase of Oxford's £1.3bn fundraising campaign. He retired in 2010 and is now Emeritus Professor of Information Management at Oxford. He is one of the founders of the annual Emerging Markets Symposium at Green Templeton College. His current research is on IT in mergers and acquisitions and on information strategy. He is a trustee of the Oxford Philharmonic (symphony orchestra), serves on the Finance Board of the Diocese of Gloucester, and is involved with other voluntary and charitable organisations.

== Selected publications ==
Books

- Earl, Michael J. Management strategies for information technology. Prentice-Hall, Inc., 1989.
- Earl, Michael J. " Perspectives on Management" Oxford University Press, 1983 (and others)

Articles, a selection

- Earl, Michael J., Sampler, J. L., and J. E. Short "Strategies for Business Process Reengineering ", Journal of Management Information Systems: Evidence from Field Studies, Journal of Management Information Systems, Vol 12 No 1, Summer 1995
- Earl, M. J. and Bensaou, M. "The Right Mindset for Managing Information Technology", Harvard Business Review, Sept- Oct 1998
- Cash, J. I., Earl, M. J. and R. Morison "Teaming Up to Crack Innovation and Enterprise Integration", Harvard Business Review, Nov 2008
- Earl, Michael J. "Knowledge Management Strategies: Toward a Taxonomy", Journal of Management Information Systems, Summer 2001
- Earl, Michael J. and D. Feeny, "is your CIO Adding Value?" Sloan Management Review, Vol 35, No 3, Spring 1994
- Earl, Michael J. "The new and the old of business process redesign." The Journal of Strategic Information Systems 3.1 (1994): 5-22.
- Earl, Michael J. "Experiences in strategic information systems planning." MIS Quarterly 17.1 (1993): 1-24.
- Rockart, John F., Michael J. Earl, and Jeanne W. Ross. "Eight imperatives for the new IT organization." Sloan management review 38.1 (1996): 43-55.
- Earl, Michael J., and Ian A. Scott. "What is a chief knowledge officer." Sloan management review 40.2 (1999): 29-38.
- Earl, Michael J. "The risks of outsourcing IT." Sloan management review 37.3 (2012).
