= Michael Scott Morton =

Michael S. Scott Morton (born 25 August 1937 in Mukden in Manchuria) is a business theorist, and is the Jay W. Forrester Professor of Management (Emeritus) at MIT Sloan School of Management, known for his contributions to Strategic information systems and benchmarking e-learning.

== Biography ==
After starting engineering at the University of Glasgow, Scott Morton move to the United States and completed an undergraduate degree in 1961 at Carnegie Mellon University. He received his D.B.A. from the Harvard Business School.

== Career ==
Scott Morton started his academic career in 1966 at the Massachusetts Institute of Technology, initially in the fields of Accounting and Control Systems. He was founding director of the MIT Center for Information Systems Research (CISR), serving as director from 1974 to 1976. From 1976 to 1981 he was Deputy Dean of the MIT Sloan School of Management, where later he was appointed Jay W. Forrester Professor of Management. From 1983 he was area head of the Strategy Group, and in 1992 he became area head for the Behavioral Policy Sciences (BPS) group at MIT Sloan.

Scott Morton co-founded three companies in the fields of Information and Control Systems and is active as an Angel investor. He has previously served on the boards of Index Systems Inc; Emhart Corporation; ICL Plc; Sequent Computer Systems; Genrad Corporation, and Merrill Corporation. He was a trustee of the State Street Research and Management Company funds and the Metropolitan Life Series Funds.

== Research ==
Scott Morton's early work formed the basis of what became known as Decision Support Systems: the use by managers of interactive computer systems to support their decision-making.

Dr. Scott Morton taught and did research at MIT in the areas of Corporate Strategy. In 1984 he initiated a join research program with various UK and US corporations, resulting in two books published by Oxford University Press. From 1995-1999 he was the co-director of a school-wide research initiative, which aimed to understand and invent new ways of working and put them into practice.

He has most recently been involved in the Cambridge-MIT Institute (CMI), a joint venture funded by the UK's Department of Trade and Industry (DTI). The program is designed to contribute to improving Britain's performance in the areas of productivity, competitiveness, and entrepreneurship. He has authored or co-authored 8 books and numerous articles.

== Appointments ==
His formal "not for profit sector" appointments are:

- Vice President, National Trust for Scotland, Edinburgh
- Governor, Handel and Haydn Society, Boston
- Director, Scottish Institute for Enterprise
- Chairman of the Board, National Trust for Scotland Foundation
- Former member, Court of Glasgow University

== Selected publications ==
Scott Morton authored or co-authored about eight books and numerous articles. Books and working papers, a selection:

- Gorry, George Anthony, and Michael S. Scott Morton. A framework for management information systems. Vol. 13. Massachusetts Institute of Technology, 1971 (1989 reprint and retrospective commentary) synthesising work from Robert Anthony and Herbert Simon.
- Michael S. Scott Morton. "Reflections of Decision Support Pioneers" on dssresources.com ()
- Keen, Peter G.W. and Michael S. Scott Morton. Decision support systems: an organizational perspective. Vol. 35. Reading, MA: Addison-Wesley, 1978.
- Luconi, Fred L., Thomas W. Malone, and Michael S. Scott Morton. Expert systems and expert support systems: the next challenge for management. (1984).
- Scott Morton, Michael S. The Corporation of the 1990s: Information Technology and Organizational Transformation. New York, 1991.
- Scott Morton, Michael S. Information Technology and the Corporation of the 1990s: Research Studies. Oxford University Press, New York, 1995.
- Malone, Thomas W., Robert Laubacher, and Michael S. Scott Morton. Inventing the Organizations of the 21st Century. The MIT Press, Cambridge, MA, 2003. (2003)

Articles, a selection:

- Benjamin, Robert I., David W. de Long, and Michael S. Scott Morton. "Electronic data interchange: how much competitive advantage?." Long Range Planning 23.1 (1990): 29-40.
- Scott Morton, Michael S. (1991). The Corporation of the 1990s. New York: Oxford University Press.
- Scott Morton, Michael S. (1995). Information Technology and the Corporation of the 1990s : Research Studies. Oxford University Press.
