= Dale L. Goodhue =

American computer scientist

Dale Louis Goodhue (born ca 1944) is an American Information systems researcher, and professor emeritus at the Management Information Systems Department of the University of Georgia, known for his work on enterprise systems and data management in large organizations.

== Life and work ==
Goodhue was born in Pennsylvania, and grew up in Atlanta and Savannah. He received his BA at Brown University, his MA from Carnegie Mellon University, and in 1988 his PhD at the Massachusetts Institute of Technology with a thesis entitled "Supporting Users of Corporate Data."

Goodhue had started his academic career as researcher at the Center for Information Systems Research, MIT, where in 1986 with Judith A. Quillard, and John F. Rockart he had published his first working paper, entitled "The management of data: preliminary research results." In 1988 he participated in NIST workshop on Information Management Directions in 1988. In that year he also published his first article in the Data Base journal.

After graduation in 1989 he was appointed assistant professor in Information and Decision Science at the University of Minnesota, where he joined the Management Information Systems Research Center of their Graduate School of Business Administration. In 1996 he moved to the U.S. Coast Guard Academy, and early 2000s he was appointed Professor at the Management Information Systems Department of the University of Georgia, where he headed the department from 2003 to 2006, and from 2009 to 2012 . Around 2015 he became professor emeritus at the C. Herman & Mary Virginia Terry Chair of Business Administration. Goodhue has worked as business analyst and been senior editor for the MIS Quarterly journal.

Goodhue research interests are in the field of "Data management in large organizations, Task-Technology Fit, User evaluations, and IS success, Management of IS"

== Selected publications ==
Goodhue has authored and coauthored numerous publications in his field of expertise. Books and papers, a selection:

- Goodhue, Dale L., Judith A. Quillard, and John F. Rockart. The management of data: preliminary research results. Sloan WP No. 1786-86. Center for Information Systems Research, MIT (1986).
- D.L. Goodhue. Supporting Users of Corporate Data. Ph.D. Thesis, Massachusetts Institute of Technology, Boston, 1988
- Goodhue, D. L., Kirsch, L. J., Quillard, J. A., & Wybo, M. D. (1990). Strategic data planning: lessons from the field. University of Minnesota MIS Research Center Working Paper No. 91-05.

Articles, a selection:

- Goodhue, Dale. "I/S attitudes: toward theoretical and definitional clarity." ACM SIGMIS Database 19.3-4 (1988): 6–15.
- Goodhue, Dale L., and Ronald L. Thompson. "Task-technology fit and individual performance." MIS Quarterly (1995): 213–236.
- Goodhue, Dale L. "Understanding user evaluations of information systems." Management science 41.12 (1995): 1827–1844.
- Ross, Jeanne W., Cynthia Mathis Beath, and Dale L. Goodhue. "Develop long-term competitiveness through IT assets." Sloan management review 38.1 (1996): 31–42.
- Loiacono, Eleanor T.; Watson, Richard T.; Goodhue, Dale L. (2002). "WebQual: A measure of website quality". Marketing Theory and Applications. 13 (3): 432–438.
- Gattiker, Thomas F., and Dale L. Goodhue. "What happens after ERP implementation: understanding the impact of interdependence and differentiation on plant-level outcomes." MIS Quarterly (2005): 559–585.
