= Stuart Madnick =

American computer scientist

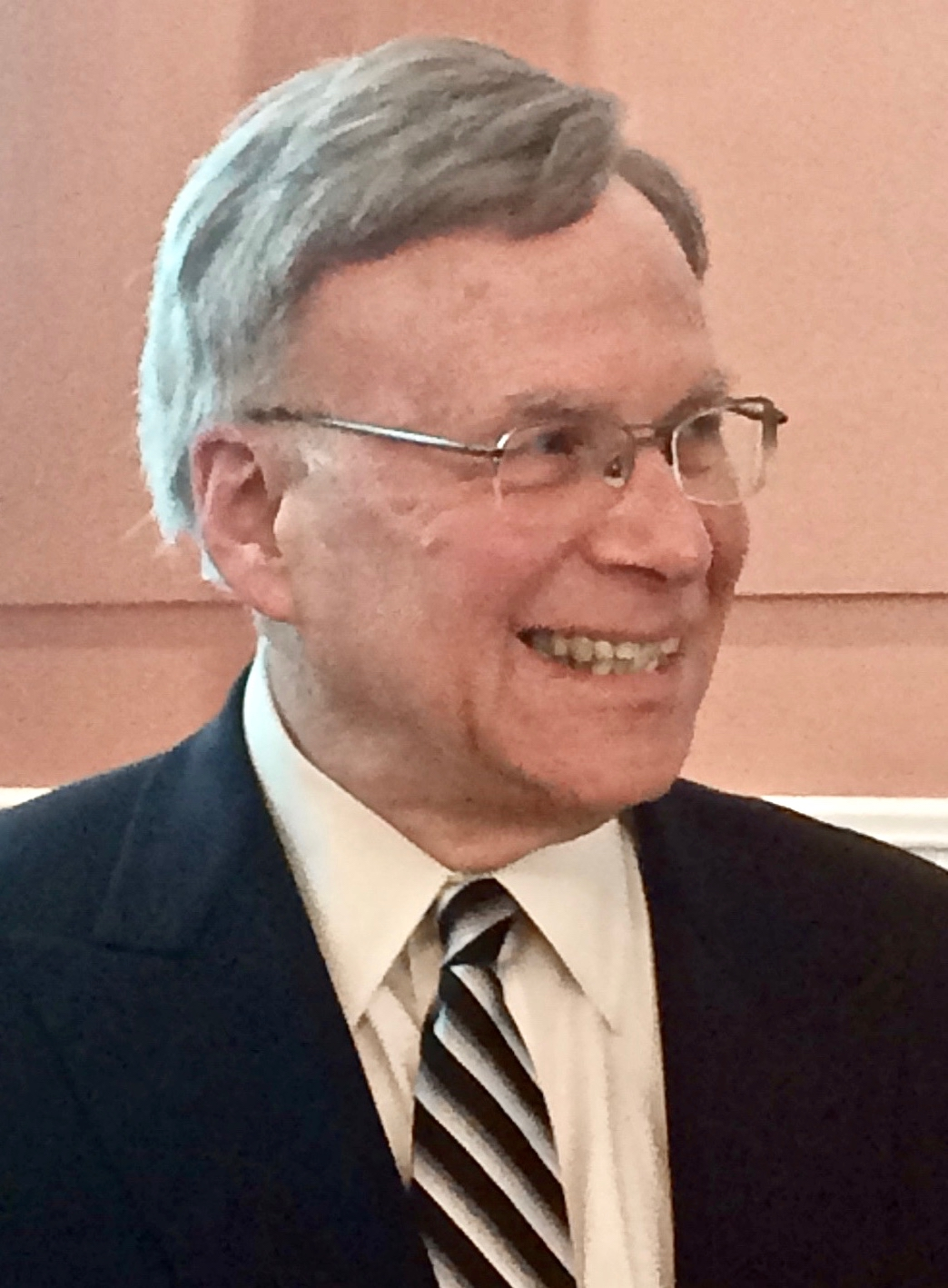
- (2018)
- Born: 1944 (age 81–82)
- Occupation: Professor at MIT

Stuart E. Madnick (born 1944) is an American computer scientist, and professor of information technology at the MIT Sloan School of Management and the Massachusetts Institute of Technology school of engineering. He is the director of Cybersecurity at MIT Sloan (CAMS), formerly called the MIT Interdisciplinary Consortium for Improving Critical Infrastructure Cybersecurity ((IC)³).

== Life and work ==
Madnick has degrees in Electrical Engineering (B.S. and M.S.), Management (M.S.), and Computer Science (Ph.D.) from MIT.

Madnick has been a faculty member at MIT since 1972. He has served as the head of MIT's Information Technologies Group for more than twenty years. He has also been an affiliate member of MIT's Laboratory for Computer Science, a member of the research advisory committee of the International Financial Services Research Center, and a member of the executive committee of the MIT Center for Information Systems Research.

In 2010, Madnick was the John Norris Maguire Professor of Information Technology at the MIT Sloan School of Management, a professor of engineering systems in the MIT School of Engineering, and codirector of Cybersecurity at MIT Sloan (CAMS).

He has been a visiting professor at Harvard University, Nanyang Technological University (Singapore), University of Newcastle (England), Technion (Israel), and Victoria University (New Zealand).

== Work ==
His current research interests include connectivity among disparate distributed information systems, database technology, software project management, and the strategic use of information technology. He is co-director of the PROductivity From Information Technology (PROFIT) Initiative, and co-Heads the Total Data Quality Management (TDQM) research program.

He has been the Principal Investigator of a large-scale DARPA-funded research effort on Context Interchange which involves the development of technology that helps organizations to work more cooperatively, coordinated, and collaboratively. As part of this effort, he is the co-inventor on the patents "Querying Heterogeneous Data Sources over a Network Using Context Interchange" and "Data Extraction from World Wide Web Pages."

He has been active in industry, making significant contributions as a key designer and developer of projects such as IBM's VM/370 operating system and Lockheed's DIALOG information retrieval system. He has served as a consultant to many major corporations, such as IBM, AT&T, and Citicorp. He has also been the founder or co-founder of several high-tech firms, including Intercomp (acquired by Logicon), Mitrol (acquired by General Electric's Information Systems Company), Cambridge Institute for Information Systems, founded with John J. Donovan (its successor corporation was named Cambridge Technology Group, founded by John J. Donovan), iAggregate (acquired by ArsDigita, which was subsequently acquired by Red Hat), and now operates a hotel in the 14th-century Langley Castle in Northumberland in northern England. Madnick is involved with the research effort at BMLL Technologies, a Cambridge spin-off working in the field of machine learning application in the financial sector.

=== Publications ===
Madnick is the author or co-author of over 250 books, articles, or reports including the textbook, Operating Systems (McGraw-Hill), and The Dynamics of Software Development (Prentice-Hall). He has also contributed chapters to other books, such as Information Technology in Action (Prentice-Hall). In 1965, he developed the little man computer model that is still widely used to introduce computer architecture concepts. In 1968, Madnick developed SCRIPT, a text markup language for IBM z/VM and z/OS systems, which is still being used as a part of IBM's Document Composition Facility (DCF) with the current version called SCRIPT/VS.
