= John J. Donovan =

American businessman (born 1942)

John Joseph Donovan
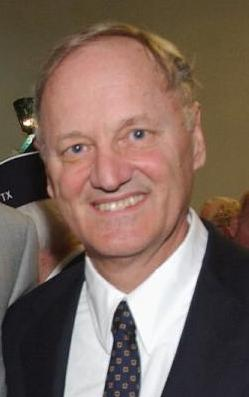
- Born: February 12, 1942 (age 84); Lynn, Massachusetts, US
- Education: Tufts University; Yale University (MS, PhD); Massachusetts Institute of Technology
- Known for: Criminal Fraud Conviction, Staging Own Shooting, Entrepreneurship, information technology
- Spouse: Linda Donovan
- Scientific career
- Doctoral advisor: David Seligson; Conrad Wogrin
- Doctoral students: Stuart Madnick; Michael Martin Hammer
- Website: professordonovan.com

John J. Donovan (born February 12, 1942) is an American businessman. He was a management professor at the Massachusetts Institute of Technology (MIT) and the former president and chief executive of the Cambridge Technology Group, an executive training company. On May 3, 2022, Donovan Sr. was convicted of a dozen felony counts of fraud and forgery in a jury trial, for attempting to steal assets from his son's widow and children.

== Academic career/claims of military service ==
Donovan attended Lynn English High School. He obtained two master's degrees - one in engineering and one in science, and a PhD - from Yale University. He subsequently was a Ford Postdoctoral Fellow at the Massachusetts Institute of Technology (MIT), In 1977, he became a tenured professor at MIT. In 2007, a MIT spokesperson said that Donovan "is completely and definitely not an employee of MIT. That is completely inaccurate." Reporting suggested that "As recently as September 2020, Donovan Sr.'s personal website described him as a Tenured MIT Professor and highlighted his MIT email address at the top of his resume. Donovan Sr. used his MIT email address to conduct business for one of his companies. And MIT still has an active webpage for Professor John J. Donovan Sr." As of 2022, MIT said about Donovan's role at the school, "We do not have any comment or information to share about former Sloan Prof. John Donovan Sr., who has not been employed by MIT for over two decades." The same article continued, "What is perhaps even more remarkable than the cover MIT provided Donovan is how long their relationship lasted. Back in 2002, the professor's daughter revealed that her father sexually abused her as a child, writing in an affidavit the following year, "The sexual abuse by my father has caused me tremendous pain, psychological trauma, and anguish, which continues to this day. Had Donovan been branded a criminal and a burden by the powerful institution he used in his sales pitches, that trail may have been a lot shorter."

He authored multiple computer science textbooks, including Systems Programming (1972) and Operating Systems (1974), and his research focused on early work in operating systems, databases, and later applications of IT to business. He also wrote business textbooks such as Business Re-engineering with Information Technology (1994) and Business & Technology: A Paradigm Shift (1993). Donovan and his son, John Jr co-authored a book titled The Second Industrial Revolution (1997).

Donovan also served as an assistant clinical professor of pediatrics at Tufts University School of Medicine. Donovan later lectured on Strategic Computing in Government while at Harvard University. He received the first Honorary Doctorate in Economics from the University of Economics, Prague since the breakup of the Soviet Union.

At the sentencing hearing of his criminal fraud trial, the prosecutor said he "was offended to read that Donovan's lawyer claimed his client was honorably discharged from the U.S. Air Force given that years earlier, Donovan himself had said—under oath—that he never made it through ROTC." At his trial, prosecutor Jack Dawley said, "You have read, Your Honor, about the defendant being honorably discharged from the Air Force," Dawley said. "In the 2003 CEE case he testified under oath that he didn't finish ROTC due to a problem with his eyes. He told this court he was honorably discharged- it shows his indifference to the court system and his lack of respect."

== Business career ==
According to Massachusetts Lawyers Weekly, Donovan Sr. "cranked up a pretty elaborate "fraud machine" to attempt to create phony offsets for the (Brining) funds" in litigation brought by Jennifer Brining against Donovan for breach of fiduciary duty, fraud, and unjust enrichment in Donovan's Send it Later failed startup. The court was also persuaded that Donovan Sr.'s "misconduct as managing director of [SendItLater] included manipulating the transfer of [SendItLater] stock in late 2016 and 2017 to certain investors, including his wife, Linda Donovan, Mr. Will Graylin, and Mr. [Navin] Fabiani, so as to unfairly benefit these investors".

Donovan started his business career by providing technical training for AT&T computer business personnel. Later courses shifted towards sales and strategy training to executives. This led to Donovan devising a method of helping companies meet their customers' needs through workshops which he ran for various companies.

Through these workshops Donovan founded many companies including: Cambridge Technology Group, One Wave, Open Environment Corporation, Cambridge Technology Partners, and CellExchange.

Multiple individuals have had problems collecting money from loans that have been given to Donovan. Former student and associate Stuart Madnick sued for $1.4 million, then later settled. Donovan and other executives from his company have also been taken to court by 10 subcontractors who claim that he was so eager to hire them for an important workshop for Citigroup that he asked them to begin working the very day he offered them the job; in their pending case, they alleged that Donovan's company failed to pay them a total of $181,000.

In March 2016, a law firm "obtained a $1.2 million default judgment against (Donovan Sr.) for unpaid legal fees".

On July 2, 2020, a judge found Donovan liable for nearly $3 million in damages, attorney's fees and interest for using funds invested in a failed startup for personal expenses. Donovan was using investor funds to pay for country club membership, hair treatments, property tax bills, and other expenses, Judge Brian Davis wrote in his decision. He was also found to have misused funds raised for a startup called SendItLater, Inc. for personal use. The shareholder suit alleged that Donovan used "the firm to support his own lifestyle and not for the benefit of the company, in which he made no financial investment of his own".

== Civil and criminal litigation ==
In August 2007, Donovan was found guilty of staging his own shooting. Middlesex Superior Court Judge Kenneth Fishman was quoted as saying "Mr. Donovan's behavior . . . can be described as nothing short of bizarre and premeditated". Donovan "carefully composed the crime scene - in which a car window was shattered by a bullet and spent .22-caliber cartridges were scattered in the parking lot - to make it appear that he had been targeted for murder by his family." It was further determined that John J. Donovan purposefully altered the viewing angles of the surveillance cameras in the areas where the crime was committed. Video footage taken a few days before the attack showed Donovan redirecting a security camera in the car park, an indication, prosecutors argued, that Donovan had staged the shooting. According to Attorney General Martha Coakley and testimony at Donovan's trial, Donovan shot himself in the abdomen, shot up his own minivan, kept a spent bullet in his mouth, rearranged a surveillance camera to prevent the recording of his hoax, and laid out the entire plan in a form of shorthand on the dinner menu of the Algonquin Club to which he belonged. Police found the "to-do" list in his pocket.

During these same proceedings the judge ordered Donovan to stay away from his four eldest children and their families. This was in part, due to the fact that one of John J. Donovan's daughters alleged she has been sexually assaulted by her father. She was joined by all but one of her siblings in seeking a separation agreement from their father. Even the son who did not join the action, John Jr., has said in court papers that he wants nothing to do with his father.

John Donovan, Sr. is subject to a lifetime Stay Away Order of the Massachusetts Superior Court dated July 9, 2009, as amended November 2, 2016. He must never be within 100 yards (91 m) of his children, their spouses and children (Donovan's grandchildren), and his daughter-in-law and her children (Donovan's grandchildren).

Significant policing resources were required to investigate the allegations that someone had attacked John J. Donovan, when in reality he had shot himself. A spokesman for the Cambridge Police Department, Frank Pasquarello, was quoted as saying "There are a lot of people who worked hard that night (of the shooting)." He went on to say "Have him come over and rake their leaves".

In court proceedings that have been adjudicated, many elements of Professor Donovan's personal relationships with his children have been brought to light. Specifically, his son, John Jr., had concerns in ensuring that his widow and children would be protected from his father. John Jr. wanted to record his issues so that they could not be left open to interpretation. "So Donovan Jr., the owner of the Manchester Athletic Club and of millions of dollars worth of other holdings, carefully documented his final wishes, in writing and on video. What he didn't know was that his father was also, secretly, recording him — recordings that Donovan Sr. admitted during a hearing last fall that he had been 'cutting and pasting' together, newly filed court documents say." Professor Donovan then took the videos that he recorded and doctored them in such a way as to indicate that John Jr. desired to leave millions of dollars to his father, which was absolutely false.

As part of these recordings, John Jr. even went so far as to indicate that he did not want his father to even attend his funeral, a true indication of the relationship between Professor Donovan and his children. This is specifically outlined in this quote: "The only references to Professor Donovan in John, Jr.'s estate planning documents concern John, Jr.'s wishes that Professor Donovan have no contact whatsoever with John, Jr.'s children, and that he not attend John, Jr.'s funeral", wrote Martin, a former federal judge. An arbitrator in the dispute issued "an order barring Donovan Sr. from using his late son's name and image under any circumstances — including a purported fundraising campaign he was allegedly conducting in his son's name".

On December 9, 2017, Donovan was indicted on "seven counts of forgery and single counts of attempted larceny" for faking "the signature of his late son, John J. Donovan III, to the codicil of his will. These charges are also indicative of the attempts of Professor Donovan to cheat his grandchildren and widowed daughter-in-law out of property. Professor Donovan is facing seven counts of forgery and single counts of attempted larceny, obtaining a signature key by false pretenses, and witness intimidation among other charges, according to a statement from the Essex district attorney's office. The elder Donovan's actions allegedly allowed him to gain the titles of properties in Hamilton, Manchester, Beverly, and Essex, according to the DA's office."

A lawsuit was filed by Donovan's son, John Jr., who claimed that his father had owed him $4.8 million for repayment of a loan. When John Jr. took legal action to force repayment, Donovan claimed he owed him nothing. An arbitrator in the case, a former federal judge, ordered Donovan Sr. to repay the loan. "I find that John Jr. was a truthful and credible witness", he wrote, "and I find the testimony of Donovan, Sr. to be unworthy of belief and false in all material respects." In court proceedings regarding the event in which Donovan shot himself in the stomach and blamed "Russian hitmen", Judge Martin was quoted as saying Donovan "deliberately lied". Additionally, based upon the result of the proceedings, "the grand jury not first to find Donovan challenged by the truth".

Donovan Sr. attempted to defraud his children and state record keepers by doctoring legal documents, an arbitrator overseeing the family's litigation stated in a scathing opinion. The arbitrator, Judge Martin, states: "[H]e conceived a fraud that had him representing that all he wanted to do was fulfill John's dying wishes, when in fact he was doctoring videotapes, audiotapes and legal documents in a manner that was so childish that even the least intelligent of us would never believe that what he was proposing was anything that John would have wanted." In an article published in the Salem News discussing the proceedings, Judge Martin issued detailed findings: "...the arbitrator overseeing the case, John Martin,... wrote, because of Donovan Sr.'s "history of misrepresenting and ignoring all that has gone before, his unwillingness to abide by the agreements he has made and his propensity for making unfounded allegations".

In the same matter, Donovan was sentenced to two years in prison when found guilty of a dozen felony counts of forgery and fraud. According to The Salem News, "John Donovan Sr. was "malicious to the core", a man who, once confronted with allegations that he'd abused one of his daughters, engaged in a 20-year campaign of revenge, his late son's best friend told the judge. New York financier Jason Konidaris, who was John Donovan III's best friend, read a statement on behalf of the family in which they described the decades of "stunningly malevolent conduct" by Donovan Sr. to "stain, smear and taint each of us with false, rehashed claims to distract everyone from his misconduct". "...for 20 years he has left a trail of tears everywhere he has been", Judge Salim Tabit said as he imposed the sentence. "Mr. Donovan believes that the rules do not apply to him." Donovan Sr.'s wife and a friend, Will Graylin, sat together in the courtroom gallery. Both had written letters of support for Donovan Sr.

Subsequent to his conviction, Donovan applied for medical parole, claiming to have no more than a year left to live. The judge in his trial said in response, "He's not a believable person. I just have trouble believing anything Mr. Donovan says." Assistant district attorney David O'Sullivan added, "The crimes were brazen in their scope, reflecting both keen intelligence and resourcefulness and an arrogant belief in his ability to deceive and escape detection. The elaborate nature of these schemes, and the time and careful effort spent in attempting to carry them off, reflect a focused, even obsessive, persistence in effectuating a criminal goal." In a subsequent hearing, Judge Tabit observed that "due to Donovan's own history of manipulations and lies, it was impossible to tell whether his condition was genuine or another one of his elaborate hoaxes."

In March 2023, Donovan asked the Superior Court to stay his sentence pending appeal, which if granted would release him immediately. However, on April 5, Judge Salim Tabit denied Donovan's request and said, "Donovan has proven himself to be nothing short of a charlatan. He cannot be believed; either about his health, where he would live, or that he would somehow abandon his 20-year quest to destroy his family."

== Public service ==
In 1978, Donovan was a collaborator in the development of a birth defect information system for Tufts University School of Medicine.

In 2001, Donovan established a $50,000 scholarship (John J. Donovan Family Scholarship) at Yale University. Through his charitable organization Children's Potential Unlimited, he donated computers to Connery Elementary School in Lynn, Massachusetts.

In 2009, Donovan was recognized by the Essex County Trail Association for his land conservation work. Donovan has also done land conservation work in Vermont.

== Personal life ==
A profile on Donovan Sr. commented: "John Donovan Sr.'s recent conviction on 12 felonies is just the latest chapter in a 20-year battle that began when his daughter disclosed that he sexually molested her when she was a child. For Donovan, Sr. all of this is about getting revenge on his children for having the courage to confront him in 2002 about molesting their sister. He has stopped at nothing to try and ruin his children's lives with endless lawsuits, despicably false smears and deranged conspiracy theories in which he is always portrayed as the victim. Accountability for his actions is long overdue." In January 2025 he lost his appeal, "Simple in its objective but complex in its execution, the scheme sought to grant the defendant broad powers over his son's property while depriving the son's widow and children of their interests in the property."

Donovan was born in Lynn, Massachusetts, to John J. Sr and Madeline Donovan. John J. Sr was an elementary school teacher and part-time police officer, and Madeline was a social worker. Donovan has mentioned that his father passed down a strong love for teaching. At Lynn High, a teacher noticed his unique ability to find patterns of mathematics and replicate them, and asked him to teach his peers. Inspired by the opportunity, Donovan credits this empowerment as life-changing. His wife is Linda Donovan. One of his sons is Jim Donovan (banker) from a previous marriage.

In a 2004 article, Professor Donovan's son, John Jr. was quoted saying, "What we have learned about dad is monstrous, and we should have nothing to do with him." A 2022 article in Crime Online said, "The rift (between Donovan Sr. and his children) began in 2002 when Donovan Sr.'s daughter revealed to her siblings that her father sexually molested her when she was a child."

== Bibliography ==
- Systems programming. McGraw-Hill. 1972. ISBN 978-0-07-017603-4. OCLC 298763.
- Madnick, Stuart E.; Donovan, John J. (1974). Operating systems. McGraw-Hill. ISBN 9780070394551. OCLC 815104.
- Software projects : pedagogical aids for software education and research. World Cat. 1977. ISBN 9780070175914. OCLC 2695022.
- Crisis in technology : the solution, strategic weapons and tactics for executives : handbook for implementing strategic advantage through technology. World Cat. 1990. ISBN 9780962179402. OCLC 22801844.
- Business and technology : a paradigm shift : strategic weapons and tactics for executives : handbook for implementing strategic advantage through technology. World Cat. 1992. OCLC 26960141.
- Business re-engineering with information technology : sustaining your business advantage : an implementation guide. Prentice Hall. 1994. ISBN 978-0-13-311028-9. OCLC 30079027.
- The second industrial revolution : reinventing your business on the web. World Cat. 1997. ISBN 9780137456215. OCLC 42443281.
