= John F. Rockart =

American business theorist

John Fralick (Jack) Rockart (1931 – February 3, 2014) was an American organizational theorist, and Senior Lecturer Emeritus at the Center for Information Systems Research at the MIT Sloan School of Management.

== Biography ==
Born in New York City, Rockart received his AB from the Woodrow Wilson School of Public and International Affairs at Princeton University, his MBA from Harvard Business School, and in 1968 his PhD in management from MIT.

After graduation, Rockart started his academic career as Instructor in the MIT Sloan School of Management. In 1967 he was appointed Assistant Professor, in 1970 Associate Professor, and in 1974 Senior Lecturer. Since 1976 he was also Director of the MIT Center for Information Systems Research (CISR), where he was succeeded by Peter Weill in 2000.

In 1989 Rockart was awarded the Nonfiction Computer Press Association Book of the Year Award; and in 2003, the Leo Award by the Association for Information Systems.

Rockart was founding editor-in-chief of the MIS Quarterly Executive.

Rockart's research interests focused on the "managers’ usage of computer-based information with a special concentration on the need to design information flow for effective decision making... [and] the changing role of information technology and the implementation of integrated global systems."

== Selected publications ==
Books and papers:

- Bullen, Christine V., and John F. Rockart. A primer on critical success factors. (1981).
- Rockart, John F., and David W. De Long. Executive support systems: The emergence of top management computer use. Dow Jones-Irwin, 1988.

Articles, a selection:

- Rockart, John F. "Chief executives define their own data needs." Harvard Business Review 57.2 (1979): 81.
- Rockart, John F. "The changing role of the information systems executive: a critical success factors perspective." Sloan Management Review Fall 1982; 24, pp. 3–13
- Rockart, John F., and Lauren S. Flannery. "The management of end user computing." Communications of the ACM 26.10 (1983): 776-784.
- Malone, Thomas W., and John F. Rockart. "Computers, networks and the corporation." Scientific American 265.3 (1991): 128-136.
- Rockart, John F., Michael J. Earl, and Jeanne W. Ross. "Eight imperatives for the new IT organization." Sloan management review 38.1 (1996): 43-55.
