= David C. Robertson =

American computer scientist

David C. Robertson (born ca 1960) is an American computer scientist, organizational theorist, and management consultant, known for his contributions in the fields of IT management and Enterprise architecture.

== Biography ==
After two years at Wesleyan University Robertson went to University of Illinois at Urbana–Champaign where he received his BA in computer engineering in 1982. In 1990 he received his PhD from the Massachusetts Institute of Technology.

After one year of postdoctoral fellowship (1990-1991) at the MIT Computer Science and Artificial Intelligence Laboratory, Robertson began a decade of industry work as an Associate Partner at McKinsey & Company. He directed the consulting firm ATG from 1996 to 1998, and was vice president marketing for a year at eCredit.com and a year at Baan, and another year CEO of Tradeffect.

In 2002 he proceeded his academic career as Professor of Innovation and Technology Management at the International Institute for Management Development in Switzerland. From 2010 to 2017, he was a Professor of Practice at the Wharton School. He is currently a Senior Lecturer at MIT Sloan School of Management.

== Selected publications ==
Books:

- Ross, Jeanne W., Peter Weill, and David C. Robertson. Enterprise architecture as strategy: Creating a foundation for business execution. Harvard Business Press, 2006.
- David Robertson with Bill Breen. Brick by Brick: How Lego Rewrote the Rules of Innovation and Conquered the Toy Industry. Crown Business, 2013.

Articles, a selection:

- David Robertson and Thomas Allen. "Managing CAD Systems in Mechanical Design Engineering." IEEE Transactions on Engineering Management, Vol. 39, No. 1 (February 1992): pp. 22–31.
- David Robertson and Nils Fonstad "Transforming a Company Project by Project: The IT Engagement Model." MIS Quarterly Executive, Vol 5, No 1 (March 2006).
- David Robertson and Per Hjuler, "Innovating a Turnaround at LEGO," Harvard Business Review, September 2009.
