= Peter Weill =

Australian computer scientist

- Born: c. 1955
- Education: Melbourne University; New York University Stern School of Business
- Scientific career
- Fields: Computer Science

Peter Weill (born c. 1955) is an Australian computer scientist and organizational theorist, Professor of Information Systems Research at the MIT Sloan School of Management, and chairman of the MIT Center for Information Systems Research (CISR).

== Biography ==
After receiving his BE with honours from Melbourne University in 1978 and his MBA in 1984, Weill proceeded to study management information systems at the New York University Stern School of Business, where he received his M.Phil in 1987, and his PhD in 1988.

Weill started his academic career at the Melbourne University, where he was Professor of Management Information Systems and Director of its Centre for Management of Information Technology (CMIT) at the Melbourne Business School (MBS). In July 2000 he joined Sloan as Director of the MIT Center for Information Systems Research, where July 2008 he was succeeded by Jeanne W. Ross, and Weill became chairman of the CISR.

Weill was awarded the Library Journal of America’s best business book of the year award for his 2001 Place to Space: Migrating to eBusiness Models. In 2007 Weill also received the MIT Sloan Outstanding Teacher Award. In 2008 he was recognized by Ziff Davis as one of the "Top 100 Most Influential People in IT" and the top academic in the field.

== Selected publications ==
- Weill, Peter, and Michael R. Vitale. Place to space: Migrating to eBusiness Models. Harvard Business Press, 2001.
- Weill, Peter, and Jeanne W. Ross. IT governance: How top performers manage IT decision rights for superior results. Harvard Business Press, 2004.
- Ross, Jeanne W., Peter Weill, and David C. Robertson. Enterprise architecture as strategy: Creating a foundation for business execution. Harvard Business Press, 2006.

Articles, a selection:

- Weill, Peter. "The relationship between investment in information technology and firm performance: a study of the valve manufacturing sector." Information Systems Research 3.4 (1992): 307-333.
- Broadbent, Marianne, and Peter Weill. "Management by maxim: how business and IT managers can create IT infrastructures." Sloan management review 38 (1997): 77-92.
- Broadbent, Marianne, Peter Weill, and Don St. Clair. "The implications of information technology infrastructure for business process redesign." MIS Quarterly (1999): 159-182.
