= Natalia Levina =

Ukrainian-American academic

Natalia Levina is a Ukrainian-American academic in the field of information systems. She is the Paganelli-Bull Professor of Technology & International Business at the Leonard N. Stern School of Business at New York University. She was elected a Fellow of the Association for Information Systems in 2022. She teaches "Digital Innovation and Crowdsourcing," a course offered to undergraduate students.

== Education ==
Levina earned a Bachelor of Arts in Computer Science and Mathematics summa cum laude and a Master of Arts in Mathematics from Boston University. She received a Ph.D. in Information Technology from the MIT Sloan School of Management in 2001, with a secondary concentration in organizational studies.

== Career ==
Levina joined the faculty of the Stern School of Business in 2001. She was promoted through the academic ranks and appointed Paganelli-Bull Professor of Technology & International Business.

She has held visiting or affiliated academic appointments at institutions including the University of Cambridge, the University of California, Santa Barbara, and Warwick Business School.

=== Research ===
Levina’s research examines how organizations coordinate work across professional, organizational, and geographic boundaries during the development and use of information systems. Her work is primarily qualitative and theory-driven, drawing on organizational and sociological perspectives.

She is particularly known for research on:

- Cross-boundary collaboration in information systems development
- Open innovation and crowdsourcing communities
- Status dynamics and governance in digital platforms
- Organizational evaluation and adoption of artificial intelligence technologies

Her research has been published in leading peer-reviewed journals, including Information Systems Research, MIS Quarterly, Organization Science, Academy of Management Journal, and Decision Sciences.

=== Recognition ===
She was elected a Fellow of the Association for Information Systems in 2022. Her research has received multiple best paper awards from leading academic organizations, including the Academy of Management and the Association for Information Systems.

== Selected publications ==
- Levina, N. (2006). Collaborating Across Boundaries: A Practice-Based Theory of Information Systems Development. Information Systems Research.
- Levina, N., & Vaast, E. (2014). Innovating or Doing as Told? Status Differences and Overlapping Boundaries in Offshore Collaboration. Organization Science.
- Levina, N., & Arriaga, M. (2015). “Distinction and Status Production on User-Generated Content Platforms.” Information Systems Research.
