= Brick by Brick: How Lego Rewrote the Rules of Innovation =

Book about The Lego Group

Brick by Brick: How Lego Rewrote the Rules of Innovation and Conquered the Toy Industry
- Author: David Robertson; Bill Breen
- Language: English
- Publisher: Crown Publishing Group
- Publication date: 2013
- Media type: Print
- Pages: 305
- ISBN: 9780307951601

Brick by Brick: How Lego Rewrote the Rules of Innovation and Conquered the Toy Industry is a 2013 book by David Robertson and Bill Breen, published by Crown Publishing Group, about the business strategy of The Lego Group in the late 1990s and early 2000s.

== Content ==
The book describes the business strategy of The Lego Group in the late 1990s and early 2000s. At that time, the company reformed said strategy, avoiding a near bankruptcy and becoming one of the most profitable companies in the toy industry of that period. The authors attribute the company's rescue to the efforts of new CEO, Jørgen Vig Knudstorp, who cut costs (by, among others, reducing the number of bricks produced), engaged with the Lego fandom community, and refocused the company's efforts on its core business (design and marketing of interlocking plastic bricks) rather than side activities such as video games and theme parks.

== Publication ==
Brick by Brick was published in 2013 by Crown Business, an imprint of the Crown Publishing Group. A paperback edition was published on June 24, 2014.

== Reception ==
The book was listed by Forbes as one of their staff choices for "The Best Books Of 2013". Johnny Davis, writing for The Guardian in 2017, mentioned that the book "has become a set business text", with Sony, Adidas, and Boeing "said to refer to it", as the company's revival "has been called the greatest turnaround in corporate history".

In 2013 Richard Milne reviewed the book for the Financial Times. The review said: "Robertson's take on Lego's success holds plenty of lessons for companies pondering how to remain innovative in a fast-changing world. With new lines such as Ninjago, products such as board games, and open innovation through fan-designed sets via its Cuusoo platform, Lego is showing how far you can take one simple yet brilliant idea." Regarding the book itself, the review argues that Robertson's analysis of the company's turnaround fortunes, based on the differences in approach between the two CEOs of the period he focusses on (Poul Plougmann and Jørgen Vig Knudstorp), is "mostly successful, but some of the explanations turn on distinctions that are not always easy to grasp".

David A. Price commented on the book for The Wall Street Journal, also in 2013. He noted that the authors "provides unusually detailed reporting" of the company's recent turnaround, and that the resulting book is "a nuanced and readable case study". Still, Price finds some fault with it, such as being too hard on the earlier Lego management (Plougmann's), as well as trying too hard to see patterns and devise business-advice-like rules from too small of a dataset.

The Economic Times reviewed the book and their review concluded, "The book serves as a useful guide to anyone who is grappling with how to implement well established management and innovation theories in their own business without it having an adverse effect. For fans of the Lego brand, and in fact, anyone interested in brand stories, this book is an interesting read." Kirkus Reviews wrote that it is a "lively account of a company whose products will be familiar to most readers".
