= Brian Hamilton (actor) =

American actor and voice actor (born 1964)

Brian Hamilton (born July 24, 1964) is an American actor and voice actor. He was born at Good Samaritan Hospital in Suffern, New York and raised in nearby Thiells. Hamilton has appeared in scores of television commercials. He has also voiced Nostradamus on the Cartoon Network series Time Squad and appeared in such television shows as Days of Our Lives, Café Americain, and The Edge.

At age fifteen, while still in high school, he began acting professionally at Penguin Repertory, a summer stock theatre in Stony Point, New York. He attended North Rockland High School and St. Thomas Aquinas College, majoring in Communication Arts and English, before studying at Herbert Berghof Studio in New York City.

Hamilton served on the Hollywood Board of Directors of Screen Actors Guild. and on the guild's New Technologies Committee. He currently resides in Los Angeles, California.
