= Lego Znap =

Lego theme

- Lego Znap's logo
- Subject: Wire-frame sets
- Availability: 1998–1999
- Total sets: 19

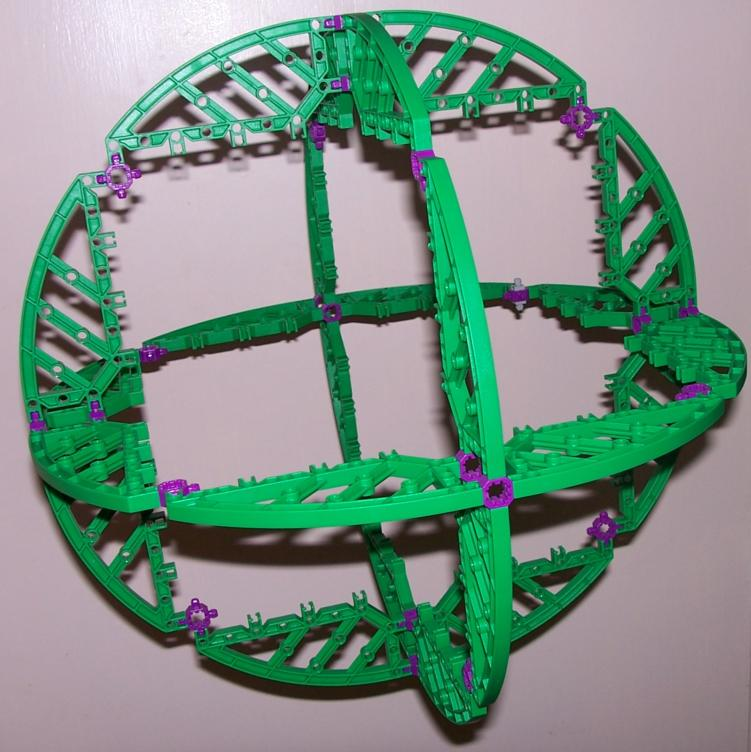
A 38cm (15") wide ball made from Znap.

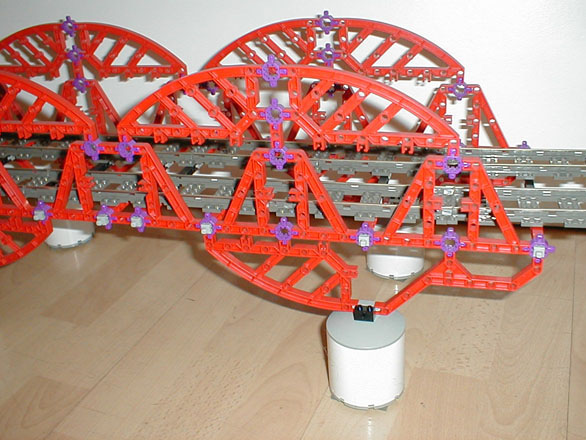
A bridge made from Znap.

Lego Znap is a discontinued Lego theme that was launched in 1998. It was similar to K'Nex and could be used to construct a variety of structures. It moved away from the traditional system of Lego construction and did not gain popularity. The product line was discontinued in 1999.

== Release ==
Znap was launched in 1998. The pieces were more complex than traditional Lego bricks, which allowed for more complicated architectural creations. The product line aimed to rival a similar construction toy named K'Nex, but did not gain popularity and was discontinued in 1999. Lego Znap was launched at a time in the late 1990s, when The Lego Group was experiencing financial problems, caused by several factors, including infrastructure expansion and an unmanageable increase in the number of produced parts with little gain in sales. Znap is listed by Business Insider as one of several product lines launched during this period "that almost ruined the company." The commercial released for the line involved a voiceover talking about a fictional epidemic of the "Znap virus" and featured kids with digitally-altered red-tinted eyes.

== Description ==
Lego Znap was a building system that could be snapped together in a flexible way to create structures such as bridges. The parts were produced in a series of bright colours.

== Construction sets ==
According to BrickLink, Lego Znap released 19 sets. Additionally, there is one set (3533) that was planned for release in 1999 but was ultimately never released.

=== 1998 sets ===
- 3501 Jetcar
- 3502 Bi-wing
- 3503 Mini-sonic
- 3504 Hooktruck
- 3510 Polybag
- 3531 Tricycle
- 3532 Jetski
- 3551 Dino-Jet
- 3552 Hover-Sub
- 3571 Blackmobile
- 3581 Formula Z Car
- 3591 Heli-transport

=== 1999 sets ===
- 3505 Airplane
- 3506 Motorbike
- 3520 Forklift
- 3521 Racer
- 3554 Helicopter
- 3555 Jeep
- 3582 Ant

== Reception ==
Znap is one of several Lego product lines with alternative building systems that have been rejected by some Adult Fans of Lego (AFOL) as "impure" and "not Lego".

== See also ==
- Lego Technic
