= Paul Israel =

Paul Israel may refer to:

- Paul Israel (rugby league)
- Paul Israel (historian)
