= Thomas Edison =

American inventor and businessman (1847–1931)

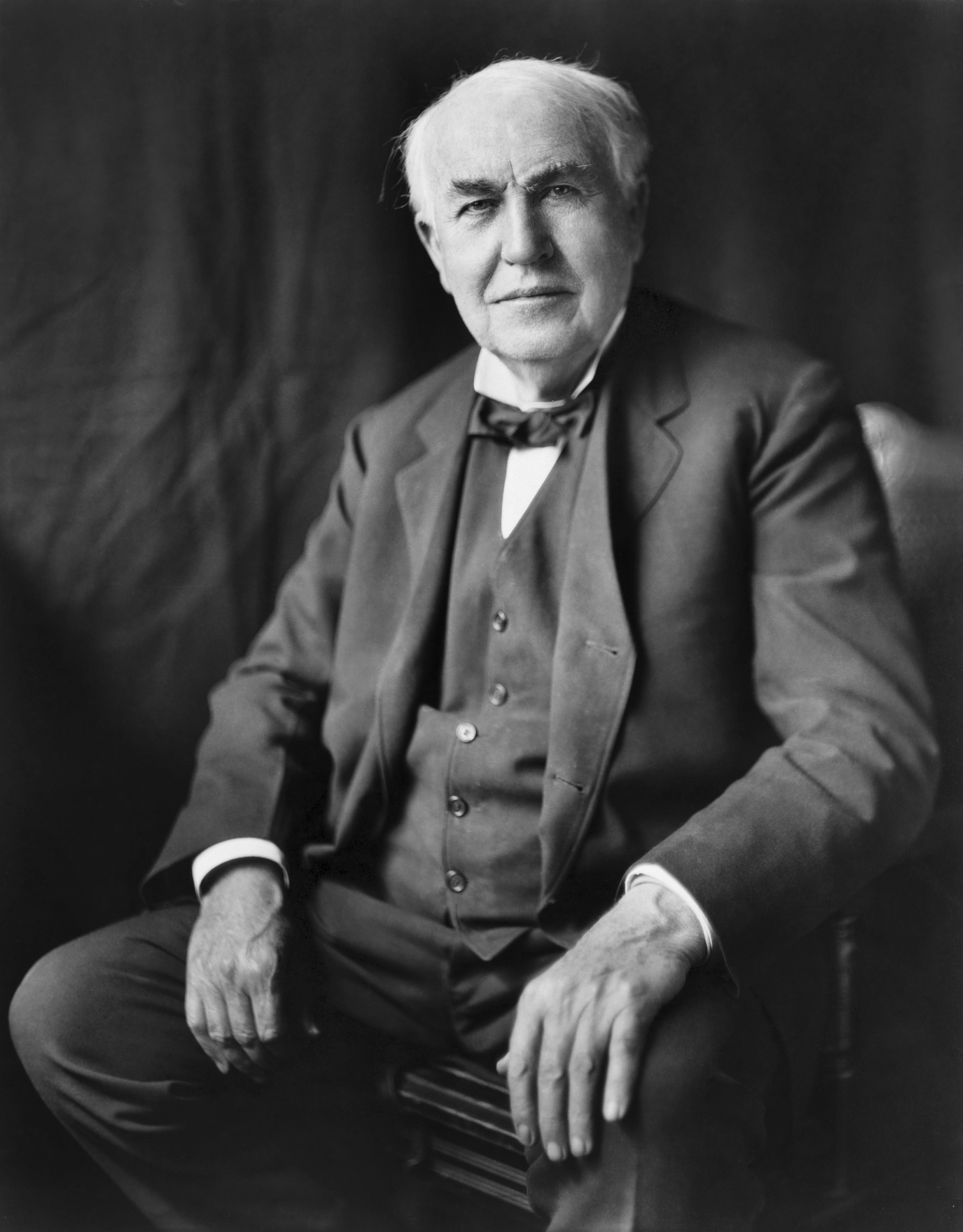
- Edison, c. 1922
- Born: Thomas Alva Edison; February 11, 1847; Milan, Ohio, US
- Died: October 18, 1931 (aged 84); West Orange, New Jersey, US
- Burial place: Thomas Edison National Historical Park
- Education: Self-educated; some coursework at Cooper Union
- Occupations: Inventor; businessman
- Years active: 1877–1930
- Known for: Phonograph; electric light; electric power distribution; early motion pictures (see list)
- Spouses: Mary Stilwell (m. 1871; died 1884); Mina Miller (m. 1886)
- Children: 6, including Charles and Theodore
- Relatives: Lewis Miller (father-in-law)
- Awards: See list: Matteucci Medal (1887); John Scott Medal (1889); Edward Longstreth Medal (1899); John Fritz Medal (1908); Franklin Medal (1915); Congressional Gold Medal (1928)
- Edison's voice Edison reciting "Mary Had a Little Lamb"; Recorded 1929

Thomas Alva Edison (February 11, 1847 – October 18, 1931) was an American inventor and businessman known for his work on the incandescent light bulb, the phonograph, electric power distribution and early motion pictures. The merger of the Edison General Electric Company and the competitor Thomson-Houston Electric Company resulted in the formation of General Electric. Edison registered 1,093 patents in the United States.

Edison was born in Milan, Ohio, but grew up in Michigan with little formal schooling. He became deaf as a child and learned through books and tinkering. Edison began working at a young age; as a railroad telegrapher, he spent much of his time inventing improvements to telegraph systems. By the age of 22, he had sold a few of his early inventions and moved to New York City to focus on engineering. He had three children with his first wife, Mary, but Edison was neglectful. She died at 29 years old. Edison had troubled relationships with his children for the rest of his life. With the help of friends, the inventor attracted investment and grew his company. By the age of 29, he owned a telegraph recorder factory in Newark with over one hundred employees.

Edison expanded, developing Menlo Park, now considered the first industrial research laboratory. Edison, known as "The Wizard of Menlo Park", drove his staff extremely hard and constantly worked himself and his associates to exhaustion. The inventor also drove up investment and publicity. He rose to international fame with the invention of the phonograph which took many years to turn into a commercial success. He later built a larger research lab in West Orange, New Jersey.

In 1878, Edison began working on an electrical lighting system which he hoped would replace the common gas lamp. Going from electrical light bulb to the modern electric grid took decades of invention, investment, and influence. Edison and his colleagues had the opportunity to get enormously wealthy as they designed and built a nation of light bulbs, generators, and electric distribution systems. Competition with Westinghouse's AC system forced Edison to yield and resulted in the creation of General Electric.

Edison simultaneously created a mining company, which was never profitable, and he nearly went bankrupt. As his role in the illumination business declined, he established a cement company and began work on a motion picture camera. The motion picture camera went from an invention to the first movie production studio. He traveled around the United States and Europe promoting his many innovations, during which he met Mina, his second wife. They had three children together, and Edison was again neglectful. During their adulthood, he began to take more interest in his sons and they eventually worked for him. Charles Edison took over his father's business when he died. In addition to acute health issues from handling toxic and radioactive chemicals during his various experiments, Thomas faced a lifelong battle against diabetes. He worked vigorously until his death. Following the success of the illumination business, he ran several companies which produced batteries, movies, musical records, and phenol. His last obsession was the search for domestic rubber production.

== Early life ==
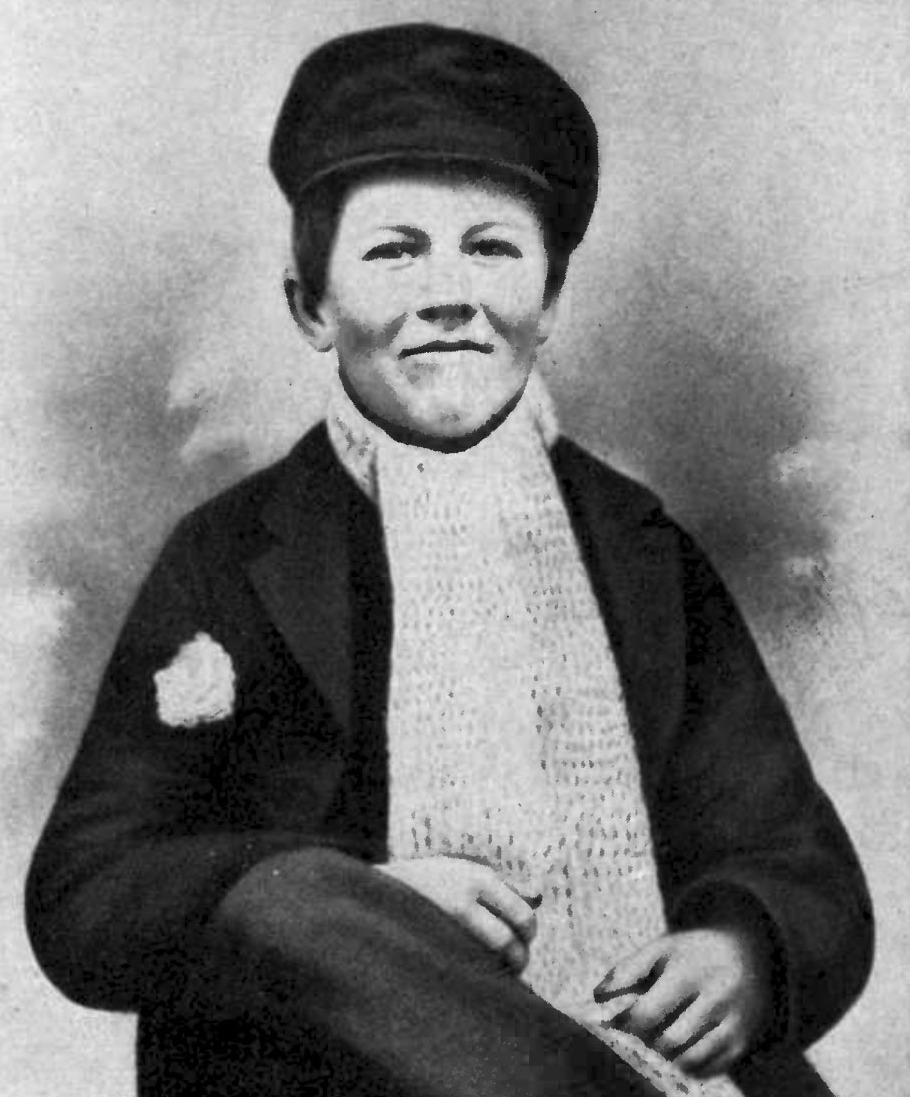
Edison in 1861

Thomas Edison was born in 1847 in Milan, Ohio, and grew up in Port Huron, Michigan, after the family moved there in 1854. He was the seventh and last child of Samuel Ogden Edison Jr. and Nancy Matthews Elliott. Samuel Edison Jr. moved to Vienna, Ontario, before fleeing to Ohio after his involvement in the Rebellion of 1837.

Edison was taught reading, writing, and arithmetic by his mother, a former school teacher. He attended school for only a few months, but was an inquisitive child who learned most things by reading on his own. Inspired by a copy of A School Compendium of Natural and Experimental Philosophy given to him by his mother, the young Edison tinkered and learned about electricity. His parents also owned a set of books by Thomas Paine, whose work inspired Edison's thinking throughout his life.

Edison developed hearing problems at the age of 12. Historian Paul Israel attributed the cause of his deafness to a bout of scarlet fever during childhood and recurring untreated middle-ear infections. The young Alva, as he was known at the time, concocted elaborate fictitious stories about the cause of his deafness. He was completely deaf in one ear and barely hearing in the other. (Note: Edison later listened to a music player or piano by clamping his teeth into the wood to absorb the sound waves into his skull.) As an adult, he believed his hearing loss allowed him to avoid distraction and concentrate more easily on his work.

Edison began his career as a news butcher, selling newspapers, candy, and vegetables on trains running from Port Huron to Detroit. By age 13 he profited about $50 ($1,792 in 2025) weekly. He spent the money on supplies for electrical and chemical experiments. He founded the Grand Trunk Herald, which he sold with his other papers. The paper ran twenty-four issues and was unique in its original coverage of local news. Five hundred people subscribed to the paper, and Edison was able to hire at least two assistants. Edison was proud of his work on the train; he displayed a framed copy of the paper's first issue in his home for the rest of his life.

As a boy, Edison and a neighbor built a small telegraph line. While working on the trains he sat in with various telegraph operators to learn the skill. (Note: At age 15 he saved a child from being struck by a runaway train. The child's father, a telegraph operator, refined Edison's skills in telegraphy.) Edison began working as a telegrapher in a local general store before moving to Stratford Junction, Ontario, where he worked as a night telegrapher for the Grand Trunk Railway. While on the job, he studied qualitative analysis, conducted chemical experiments, and slept. This negligence led to the near collision of two trains, after which he resigned.

== Telegraphy ==
Edison's first patent with a schema for the electric vote recorder

From 1863 to 1869, Edison held a succession of night-shift telegraphy positions across Ontario, Michigan, Kentucky, Ohio, and Massachusetts. As a Western Union employee, he worked the Associated Press bureau news wire. In Cincinnati, he lived with Ezra Gilliland. They formed a friendship which lasted 25 years. He joined the National Telegraph Union and wrote for their magazine. He earned a reputation among the other young, male telegraph operators for being bright and trying new things, but on several occasions his tinkering interfered with his work.

In Boston, from 1867 to 1869, Edison made some money from inventing a stock ticker for local customers, but he lost it when he tried to expand the venture to New York. His first patent was for the electric vote recorder, U.S. patent 90,646, which was granted on June 1, 1869.

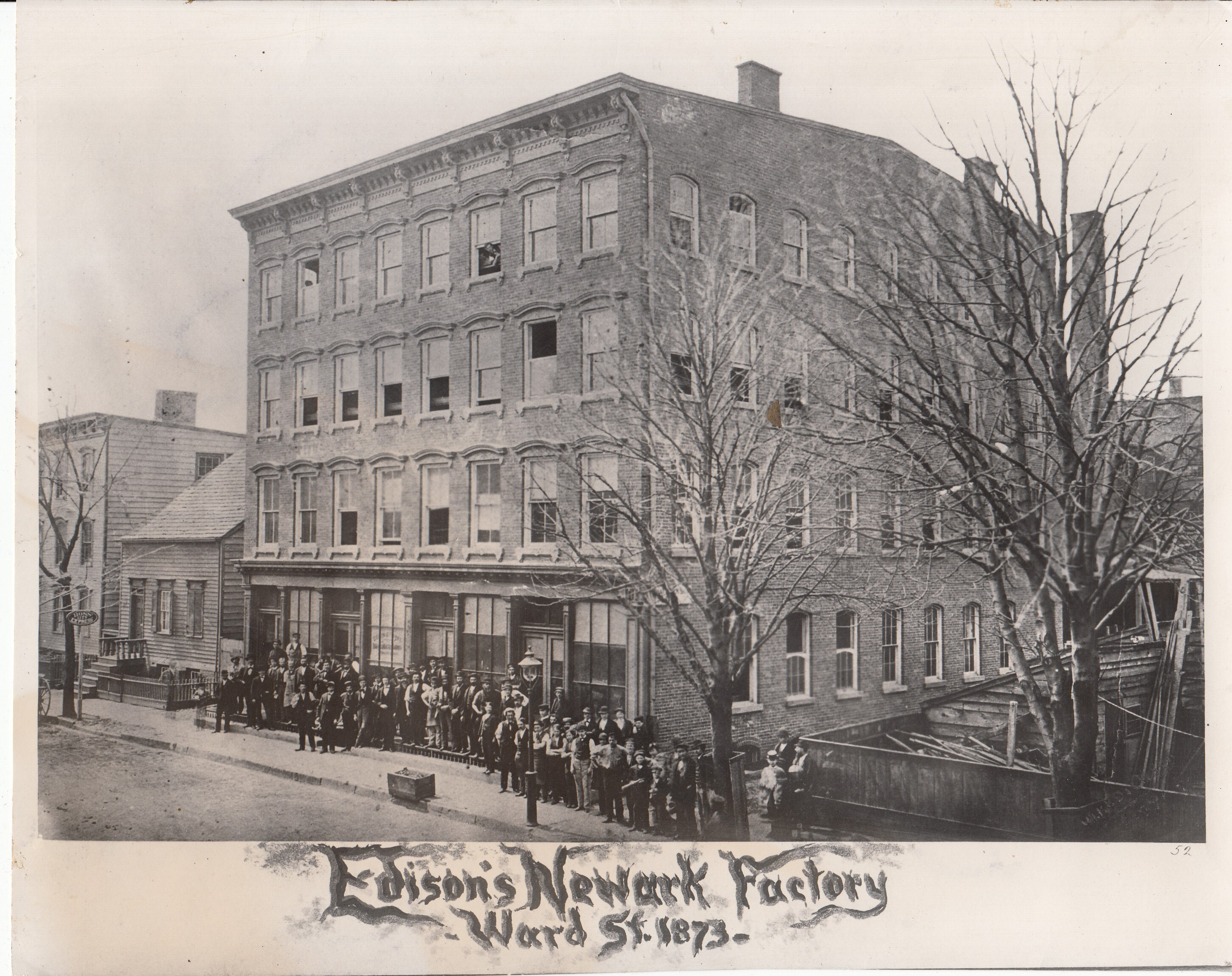
Group photo taken as a postcard of the employees in front of the factory at Edison's Newark Factory on Ward St in 1873. Edison is visible peeking out of the fourth floor window; he wrote that he was too busy working to come downstairs.

Edison moved to New York City in 1869. Among his early mentors was Franklin Leonard Pope a fellow telegrapher. He allowed the impoverished young Edison to live and work in the basement of his Elizabeth, New Jersey, home while Edison was employed by Samuel Laws at the Gold Indicator Company. Pope and Edison founded their own company in October 1869, working as electrical engineers. Edison attracted wealthy and connected investors. (Note: Such as Western Union.) With the money, they hired fifty employees within a few months and opened a larger shop in Newark, New Jersey. The company rented out telegraph lines. To win business, they manufactured machines to record telegraphs and typewriters capable of printing directly to the wire. Edison strictly regulated his employees' productivity while endlessly experimenting.

To support his work on a new telegraphy system with Charles Batchelor, Edison enrolled in a chemistry course at the Cooper Union. It was his only enrollment in courses at an institution of higher learning. At the factory, Edison and Batchelor collaborated fervently; their notebooks jointly signed "E&B" contain near-constant experimentation with improvements to the telegraph.

Edison grew the company to a few hundred employees, and in 1874, received $30,000 ($853,676 in 2025) for the quadruplex telegraph, the first device that could simultaneously transmit four messages over a single wire. Until then, Edison had struggled to meet his financial obligations and had narrowly avoided foreclosure on multiple occasions. With the money, Edison invested in the Port Huron street railway, which was owned by his brother William Pitt. He expanded his own business, and he hired his young nephew and father.

== Menlo Park laboratory ==
=== Research and development facility ===
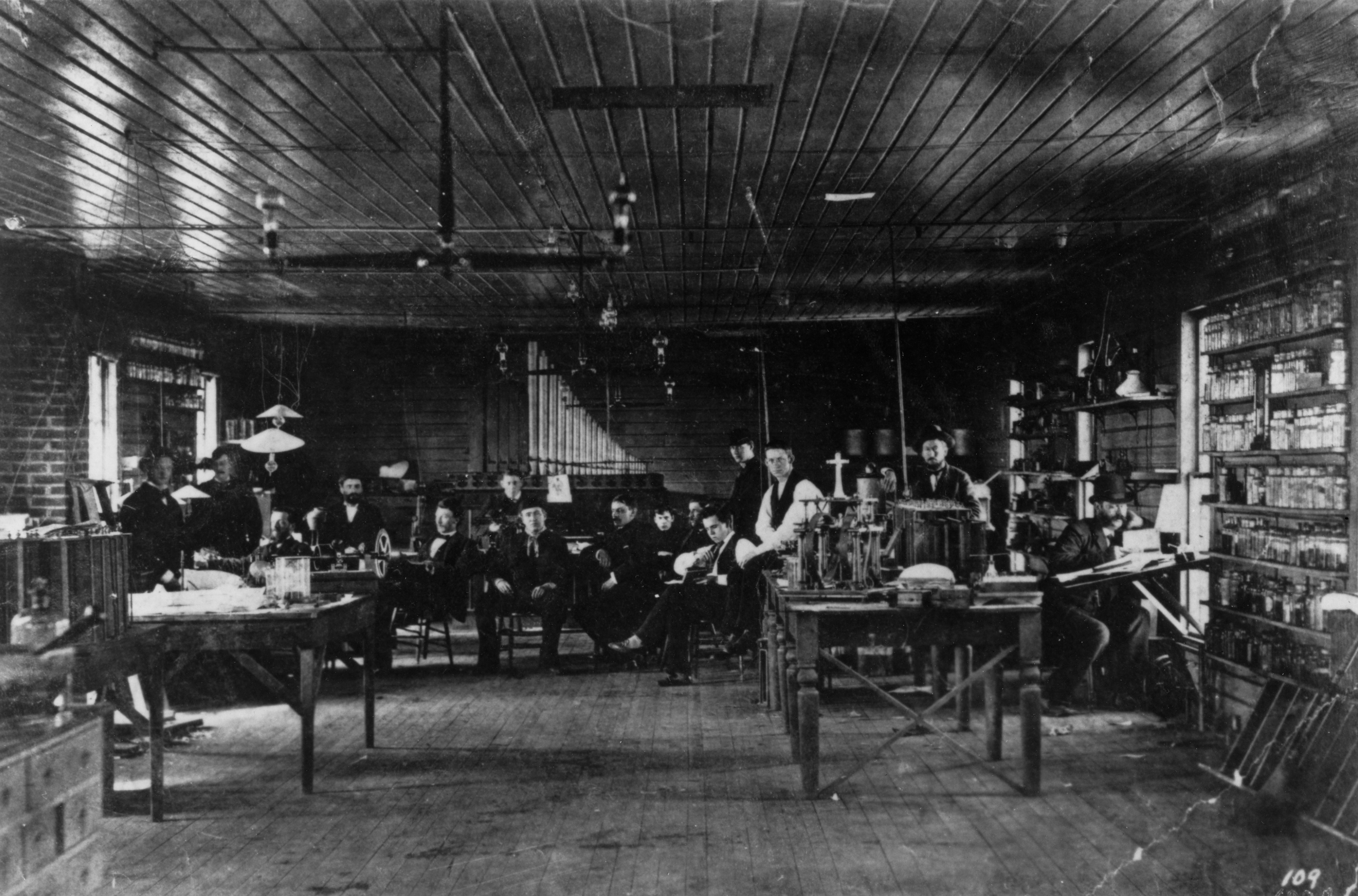
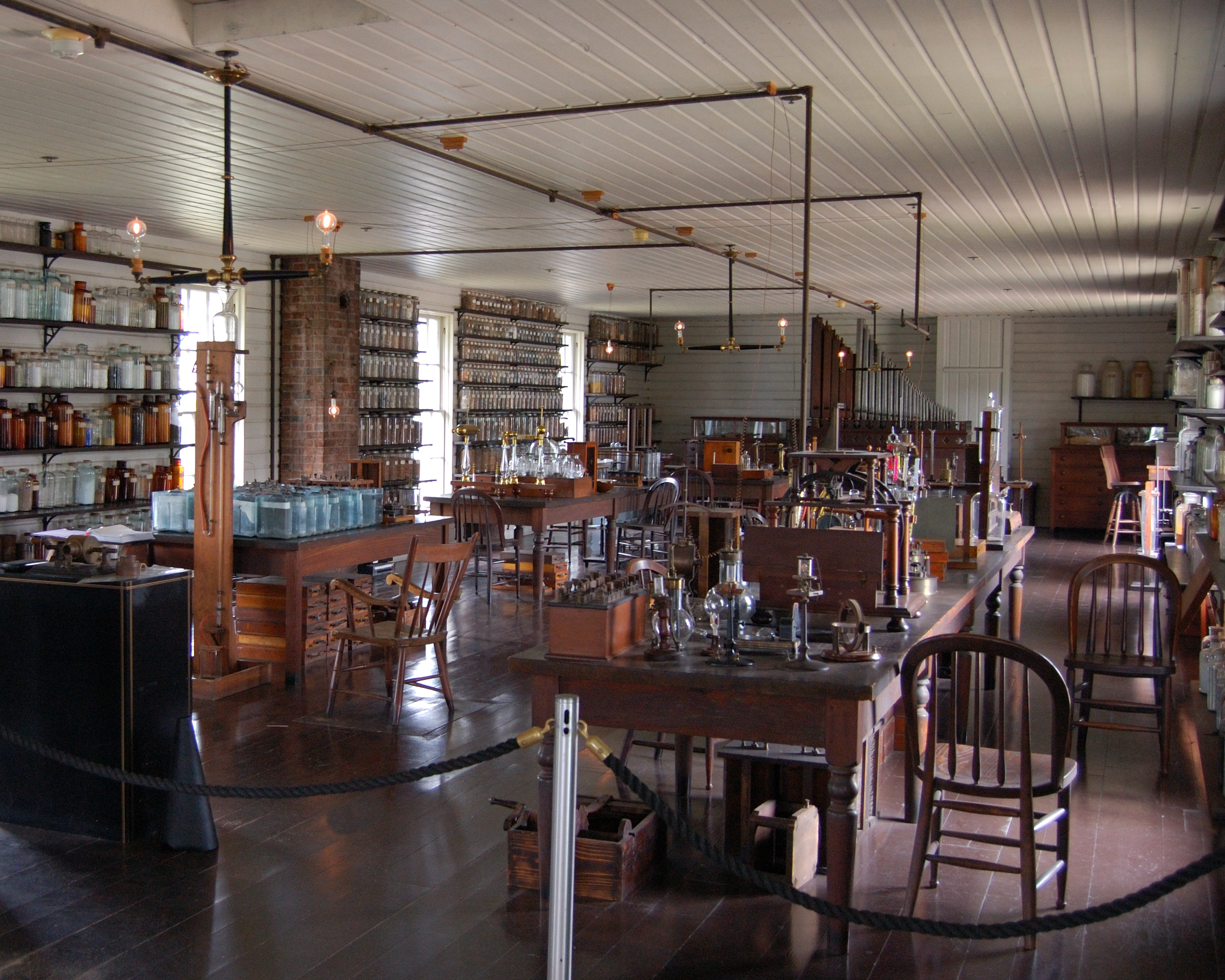
Edison's Menlo Park lab in 1880 (first) and a reconstruction of it at Greenfield Village in Dearborn, Michigan (second)

In Menlo Park, New Jersey, Edison established the first industrial laboratory concerned with creating knowledge and then controlling its application. Built in 1876, in Raritan Township (now named Edison Township in his honor) the construction was funded by the sale of Edison's quadruplex telegraph. His staff was generally told to carry out his directions in conducting research, and he drove them hard to produce results.

Edison's name is registered on 1,093 patents in the United States (Note: In addition to the United States patents, 1,239 foreign patents are registered with Edison's name.)— during his adult life, he averaged a patent once every 10–12 days. As the leader of his laboratory, Edison was credited for inventions made in large part by those working under him. He worked extreme hours and expected those around him to follow suit. This often meant 18 hours per day Monday through Friday and additional work on Saturday and Sunday. One employee described the work as "the limits of human exhaustion." Edison employed several patent lawyers and challenged the intellectual property rights of many contemporaries.

For Edison, big business came with big publicity. He shut down public and reporter access to the laboratory at Menlo Park and tailored his image via interviews. (Note: He expanded his public involvement by funding the creation of Science, which published its first volume in 1880. Edison kept his publishing role anonymous, and the journal began as a mouthpiece for pro-Edison articles. He gave up the journal in 1883 due to its lack of profit. It was subsequently led by Alexander Graham Bell.) In just over a decade, Edison's Menlo Park laboratory had expanded to occupy two city blocks. Edison wanted the lab to have "a stock of almost every conceivable material".

=== Carbon telephone microphone ===
Operation of a carbon microphone. When a sound wave presses on the conducting diaphragm, the granules of carbon are pressed together and decrease their electrical resistance.

In 1876, Edison set out to improve telephones by developing a carbon microphone. Western Union, seeking to compete with Alexander Graham Bell, financed Edison experiments. Edison believed that the weakness in Bell's telephone was the microphone designed by Emile Berliner. Edison iterated many different designs and tested which gave the best sound while ensuring it was loud enough for his deaf ears. His chosen design used two metal plates separated by carbon granules, which varied in electrical resistance in response to the pressure of sound waves. After testing 150 materials, Edison determined that parchment and tinfoil were best suited for constructing the diaphragm, while a specially coated rubber served as the semiconductor.

David Edward Hughes also published a paper on the physics of loose-contact carbon microphones in 1878. He was credited for discovering the semiconductor effect. This angered Edison and caused public controversy, particularly because Hughes acknowledged that he was advised by one of Edison's colleagues.

=== Phonograph ===
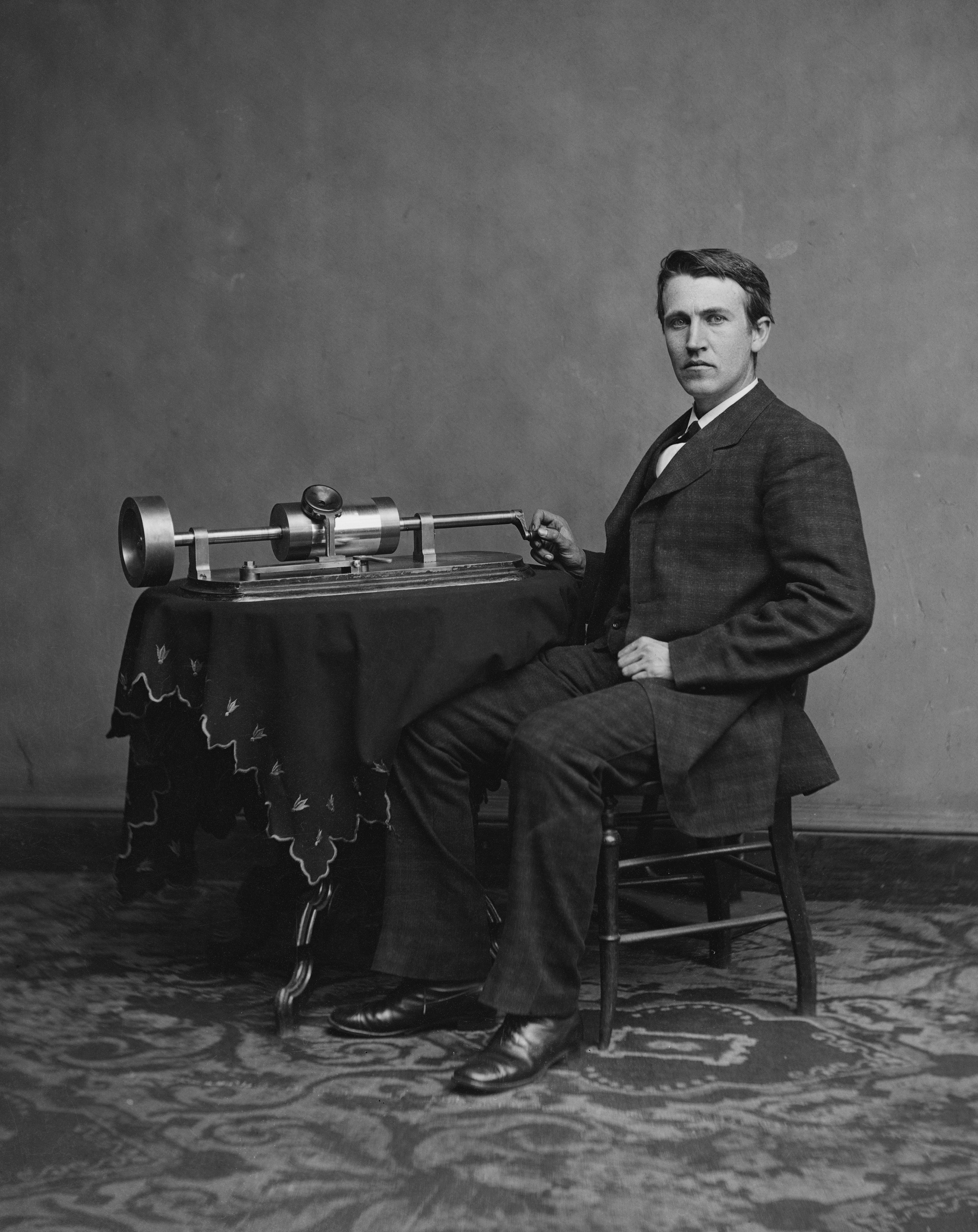
Edison with the second model of his phonograph in Mathew Brady's studio in Washington, D.C. in April 1878

Edison first gained wider notice in 1877 due to his invention of the phonograph . As a telegrapher, he had long imagined a device that could record incoming messages and replay them. He first patented a design for a rotating disk onto which telegraph messages could be embossed and later replayed. Experiments with Batchelor lead to primitive systems for recording and replaying sound. His first phonograph recorded on tinfoil wrapped around a grooved cylinder. This method limited the sound quality and durability of the recording. By November, word of the contraption was getting out. Edison then began vigorously stirring up public awareness for this new invention by engaging with journalists and performing public demonstrations. The phonograph was so unexpected by the public at large as to appear almost magical. Edison became known as "The Wizard of Menlo Park". As he aged, he grew to resent titles representing him as a genius, and he emphasized "one percent inspiration and 99 percent perspiration."

In April 1878, Edison demonstrated the phonograph before the National Academy of Sciences. Although Edison obtained a patent for the phonograph that year, he did little to develop it commercially until Alexander Graham Bell, Chichester Bell, and Charles Tainter produced a competing instrument in the 1880s that used wax-coated cardboard cylinders.

In 1887, the Edison Phonograph Company was founded to compete with Bell. Edison's friend Ezra Gilliland came to help Edison start the new venture, despite having previously worked for Bell. Unfortunately for their friendship, the venture ran out of money before getting a product to market and had to raise money from an exploitative investor. Jesse Lippincott completed simultaneous deals with Edison, Gilliland, and Bell in an attempt to form a phonograph monopoly. However, he knew Edison would not take the bargain, so obfuscated his own, Gilliland's, and Bell's roles in the deal and made the offer through Edison's personal attorney. When Edison discovered the scheme, he was infuriated, but Gilliland went to Europe, which ended their friendship. After five years of litigation, Edison assumed total control of the company. The drama led to multiple other fallouts that tore apart the tight circle of Edison's wealthy inventor-friends.

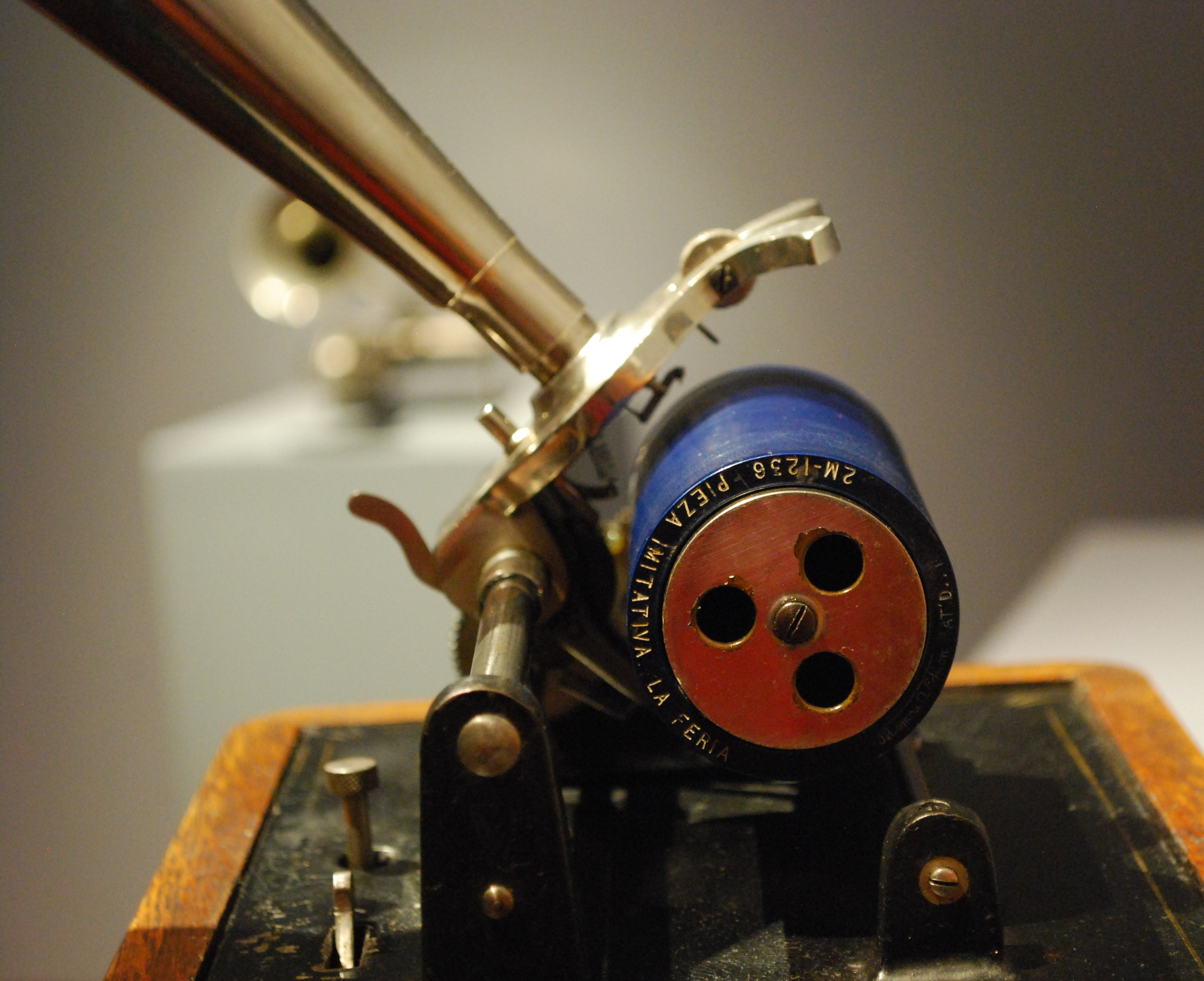
A recording cylinder and needle for a Graphophone

Edison struggled for years to bring a phonograph to market. The principal technical issue was finding a recording material durable enough to withstand prolonged use without wearing out the needle. He attempted to pivot to making talking dolls with a miniature phonograph inside. However, the system usually failed during shipment and production was shut down in 1890. Edison envisioned the phonograph revolutionizing business by redefining the role of secretaries. However, by 1899 Edison's phonograph company submitted to market demands and produced a cheap model that was in high demand for musical entertainment. In 1900, this phonograph was sold for $10 ($387.00 in 2025), and buyers could additionally select from the 3,000 different musical records produced by Edison's 1,000 employees in the phonograph works. The quality of line work was strictly supervised by experts.

Edison had no musical training, could not read sheet music, and was mostly deaf. Through 1915, he exerted tight control on the production of records, personally approving every artist based on his musical taste. Artists were not credited on the records.

Widespread adoption of the radio was detrimental to phonograph sales. Edison's business sold 90% fewer records in 1921 compared to 1920; from 1922 to 1926, radio sales went up by 843%. Younger managers, especially his son Charles, tried to get Edison to enter the radio business or adopt new advertising methods. However, Edison chose to focus on weeding out employees that did not meet his mark.

=== Tasimeter ===
Edison invented a highly sensitive device, that he named the tasimeter, which measured infrared radiation. His impetus for its creation was the desire to measure the heat from the solar corona during the total solar eclipse of July 29, 1878.

== Electric light ==
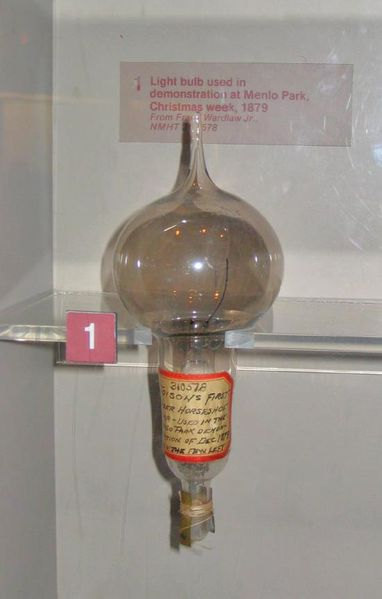
Edison's first successful model of light bulb, used in public demonstrations at Menlo Park, December 1879

In 1878, Edison began working on a system of electrical illumination that he could deploy in a large-scale commercial utility, something he hoped could compete with gas and oil-based lighting. Many incandescent lamps had been devised by inventors prior to Edison, but these early bulbs all had flaws that made them difficult to use on a large scale commercially. Such flaws included an extremely short life and the requirement of high electric current for operation. Edison first tried using a filament made of cardboard, carbonized with compressed lampblack, but this burnt out too quickly to provide lasting light. He then experimented with different grasses and canes such as hemp and palmetto before settling on bamboo as the best filament.

He addressed lighting as a system. Edison undertook experimental research involving viewing a mechanical electric generator, planning power distribution, and grand public statements to promote his work. He formed the Edison Electric Light Company in New York City with J.P. Morgan & Co., members of the Vanderbilt family, and other wealthy and connected investors he met through Grosvenor Lowrey.

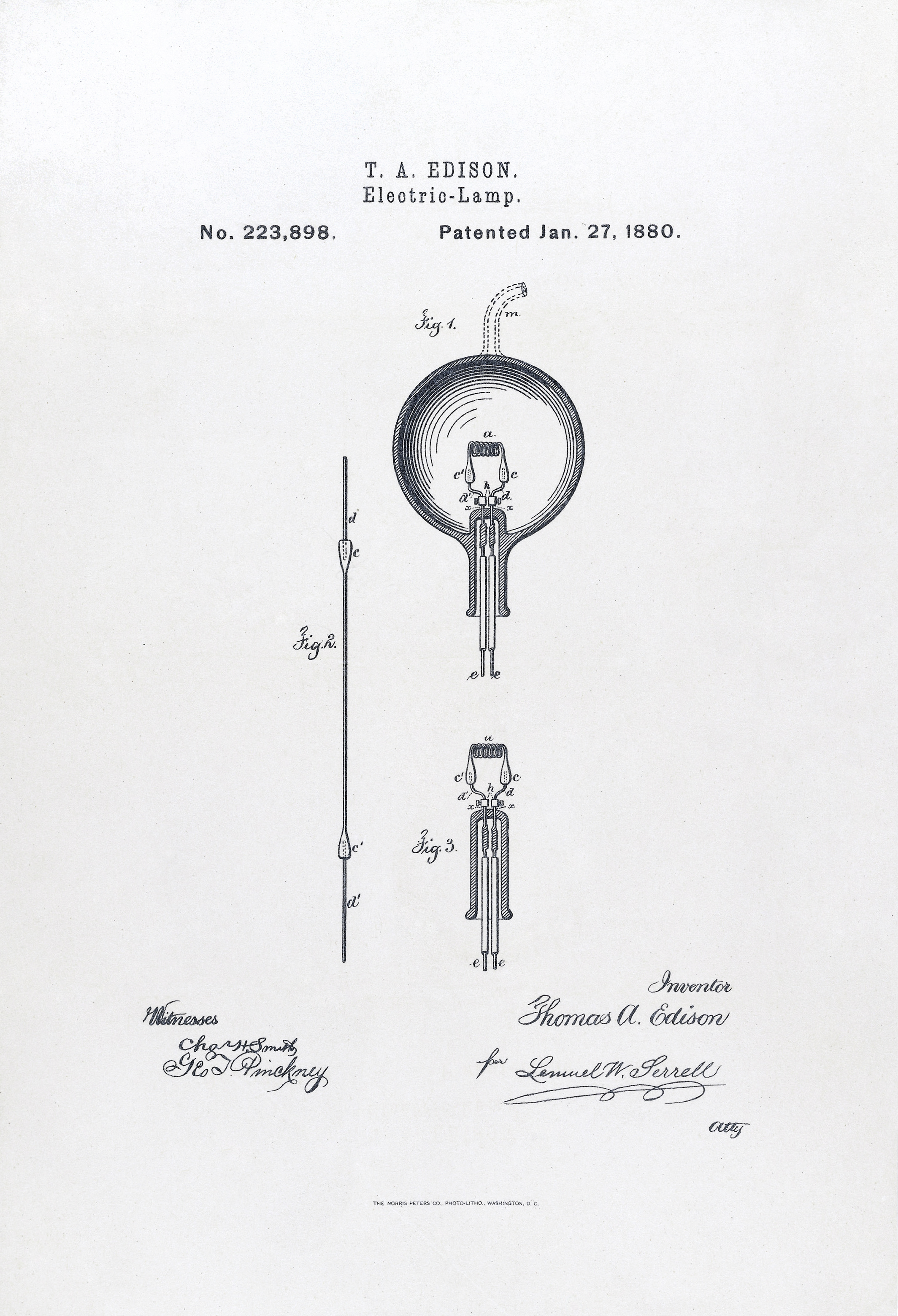
U.S. Patent #223898: Electric-Lamp, issued January 27, 1880

Edison continued trying to improve this design and on November 4, 1879, filed for U.S. patent 223,898 (granted on January 27, 1880) for an electric lamp using "a carbon filament or strip coiled and connected to platina contact wires". The patent described several ways of creating the carbon filament, including "cotton and linen thread, wood splints, papers coiled in various ways". It was not until several months after the patent was granted that Edison and Batchelor discovered that a carbonized bamboo filament could last over 1,200 hours. This high-resistance filament led Edison to select the 110V power source standard in the United States today; this was a much higher voltage than what competitors were using. Many of his employees assisted in carrying out experiments on filaments, manufacturing the glass for the bulbs, and establishing vacuums for the filament to incandesce within. The vacuum was important for extending the life of the bulb by preventing reactions between the filament and gasses in the bulb.

To prove out the distribution and scale of the system, Edison's workers strung light around Menlo Park with wires powering them. By February 1880, spectators were coming to see the "Village of Light". Edison began a parallel construction business to build these systems for small towns around the country in 1883.

Edison hired Francis Robbins Upton, a former student of Hermann von Helmholtz, in 1878. Upton received 5% of the company profits and eventually became the general manager after leading much of the research into electric lighting. He wrote some of Edison's speeches and assisted with hiring decisions. John Ott also worked for Edison; he made many of the mechanical improvements Edison suggested and conducted experiments in Edison's lab. Both men agreed to give Edison credit for most of the patents, but Ott was solely credited for some of the patents on which he worked. Ott's testimony was important for holding up Edison's patent claims. John's brother, Fred, also worked for Edison as an experimental assistant for fifty-seven years.

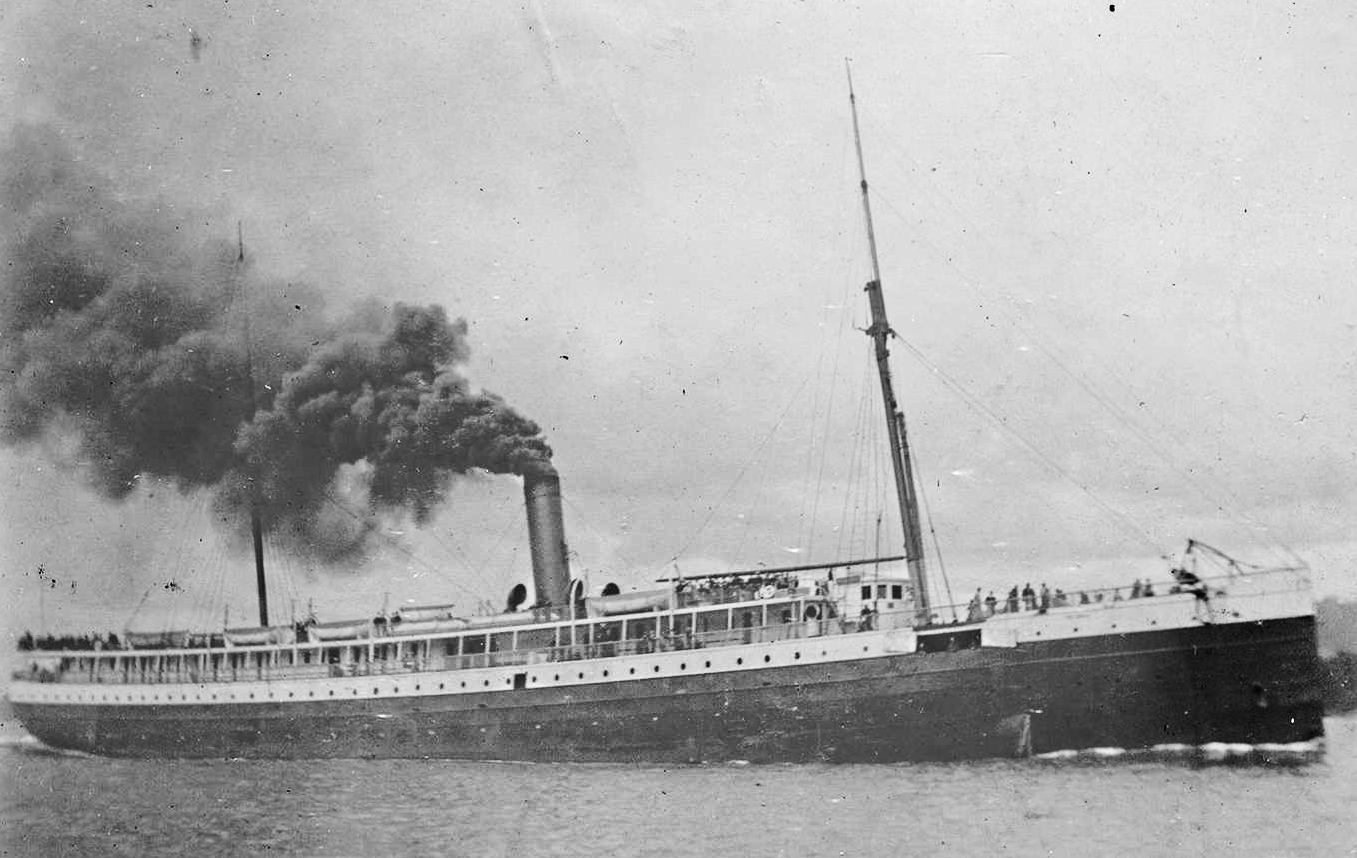
The Oregon Railroad and Navigation Company's new steamship, the Columbia, was the first commercial application for Edison's incandescent light bulb in 1880.

Henry Villard financed the construction of an electrically powered and lit train built on a custom track built by Edison's company. The train worked and some of the technology was patented, but Edison elected to focus on the bulbs and did not follow through with developing the train.

The incandescent light bulb patented by Edison began to gain widespread popularity in Europe as well. He sent engineers to promote their system, first to London, then around Europe. On September 4, 1882, Edison turned on the electrical lighting system to supply the company's 946 customers in Manhattan. But few people noticed and some came in the evening to ask why the system had not been activated—the lights were so steady and so similar to the gas the people were used to that they had not noticed the switch. There was little press but the Boston Globe stated,

Edison has had an 'opening night.' His aim is to open night until it shall be as day.

In 1883, the US patent office ruled that Edison's patented filament improvement process was based on William E. Sawyer's flashing method and was, therefore, invalid. Attempts to prevent blackening of the bulb due to emission of charged carbon from the hot filament culminated in Edison effect bulbs. Edison's 1883 patent for voltage-regulating is the first US patent for an electronic device due to its use of an Edison effect in an active component. The Edison effect was instrumental in the eventual design of vacuum tubes. To avoid a possible court battle with yet another competitor, Edison and Joseph Swan, who held an 1880 British patent on a similar incandescent electric lamp, formed a joint company called Ediswan to manufacture and market the invention in Britain. Sawyer's original filament improvement process was better, and Westinghouse, which owned rights to Sawyer's patent, was able to take a sizeable portion of the bulb market share from Edison by 1889.

=== Electric power distribution ===
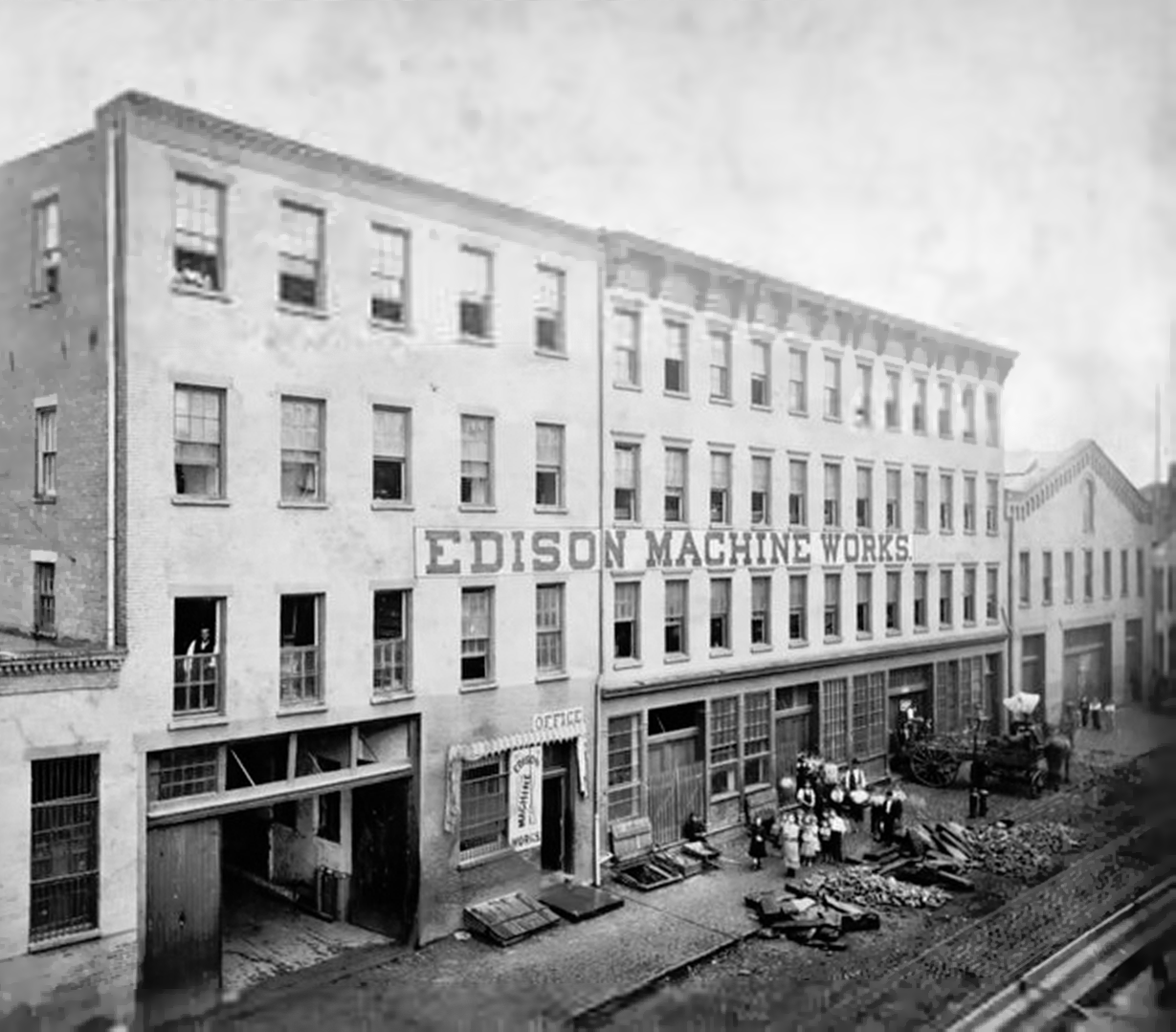
The Edison Machine Works on Goerck Street on the Lower East Side of Manhattan was set up to manufacture heavy machinery needed in Edison's electric utility. It employed a large workforce, which included up and coming engineers such as Reginald Fessenden and Nikola Tesla.

After devising a commercially viable electric light bulb on October 21, 1879, (celebrated annually for many decades in the United States as Edison Day) Edison was determined to create an electric utility to compete with the existing gas light utilities. To prove he was making progress, Edison hosted a board meeting that was illuminated by his system. On December 17, 1880, he founded the Edison Illuminating Company, and during the 1880s, he patented a system for electricity distribution.

The amount of copper wire needed to commercialize this new technology was enormous. In order to reduce the copper requirement, Edison invented the three-prong wire system which allows small gauge wires to be used than the status quo ante two wire distribution due to less current being required to power a given electrical grid.

To expand its influence in New York, especially to secure the rights for installing underground electric lines, the Edison Illuminating Company opened a second office on 65th Avenue. The Edison Machine Works and Edison Electric Tube Company opened in New York by the end of the year. Edison paid his New York workers significantly more than other firms in the 1880s. Before fully commercializing power distribution, Edison needed a way to measure how much power his customers consumed. He invented a cell with a zinc solution and zinc plates that received some of each customer's current. This resulted in zinc from the solution precipitating onto the plates, which were weighed on a monthly basis to determine how much current had passed through and bill the customer accordingly.

In January 1882, to demonstrate feasibility, Edison had switched on the 93 kW first steam-generating power station at Holborn Viaduct in London. On September 4, 1882, in Pearl Street, New York City, his 600 kW cogeneration steam-powered generating station, Pearl Street Station's, electrical power distribution system was switched on, providing 110 volts direct current (DC). Subscriptions quickly grew to 508 customers with 10,164 lamps.

=== Expansion and competition ===
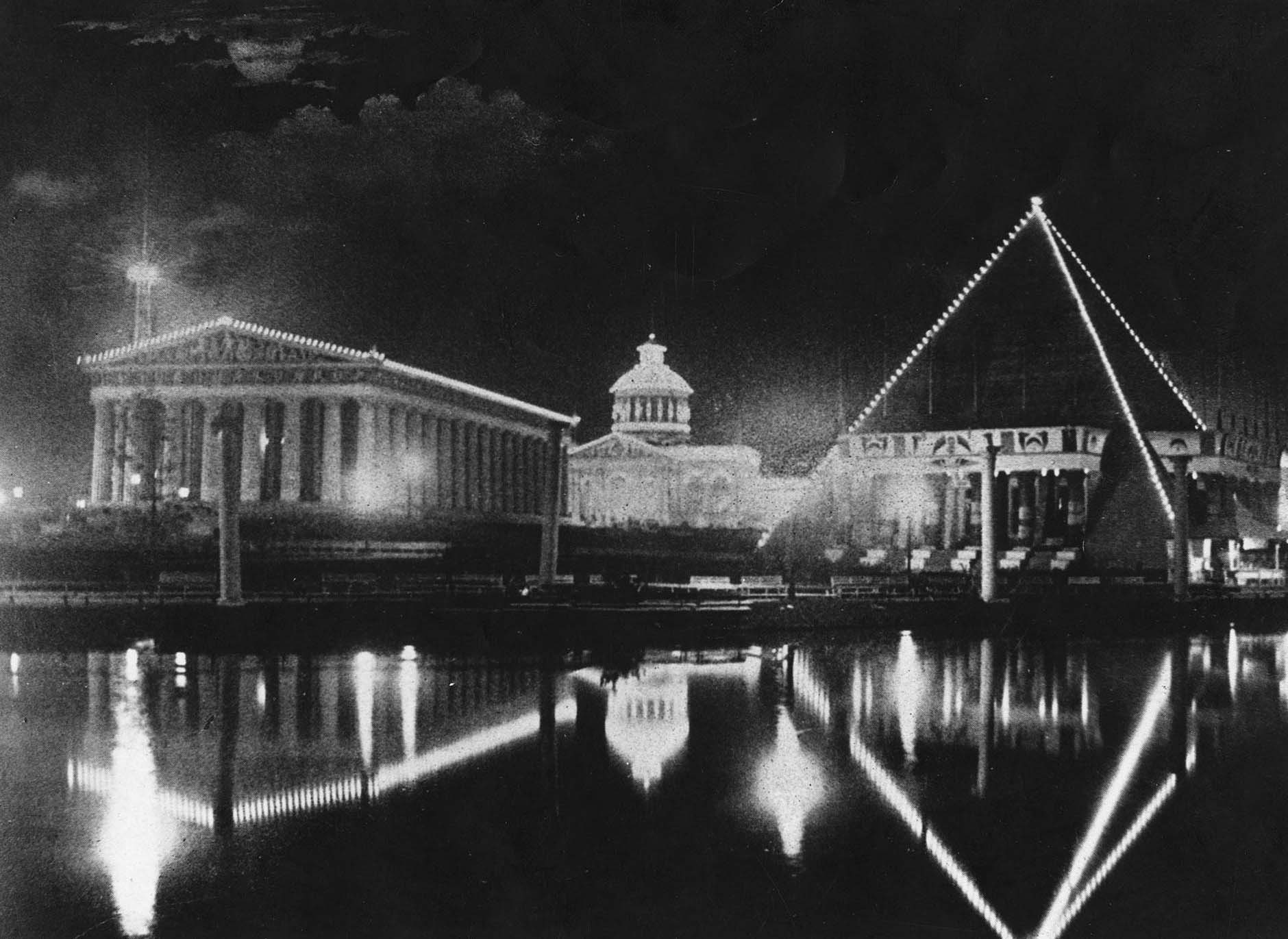
Extravagant displays of electric lights quickly became a feature of public events, as in this picture from the Tennessee Centennial and International Exposition in 1897.

As Edison expanded his direct current (DC) power delivery system, he received stiff competition from companies installing alternating current (AC) systems. With the development of transformers in Europe and by Westinghouse Electric in the US in 1885–1886, it became possible to transmit AC long distances over thinner and cheaper wires. This allowed AC to be used in street lighting and in lighting for small businesses and domestic customers directly competing with Edison. Edison's DC empire suffered from one of its chief drawbacks: it was suitable only for the high density of customers found in large cities. Edison's DC plants could not deliver electricity to customers more than one mile (1.6 km) from the plant, decreasing the number of potential customers when compared to AC plants.

Edison publicly stated that AC was unworkable and the high voltages were too dangerous. As George Westinghouse installed his first AC systems in 1886, Edison struck out personally against his competitor stating,

Just as certain as death, Westinghouse will kill a customer within six months after he puts in a system of any size. He has got a new thing and it will require a great deal of experimenting to get it working practically.

Many reasons have been suggested for Edison's anti-AC stance, fundamentally, Edison Electric had based their design on DC and switching standards after having installed over 100 systems was, in Edison's mind, out of the question. By the end of 1887, Edison Electric was losing market share to Westinghouse, who had built 68 AC-based power stations to Edison's 121 DC-based stations. The Thomson-Houston Electric Company built another 22 AC power stations.

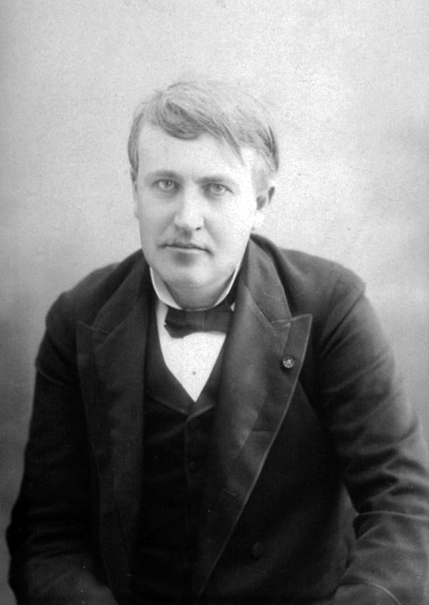
Edison in 1889

Parallel to expanding competition between Edison and the AC companies was rising public furor over a series of deaths in the spring of 1888 caused by pole mounted high voltage alternating current lines. This turned into a media frenzy against high voltage alternating current and the seemingly greedy and callous lighting companies that used it. Edison took advantage of the public perception of AC as dangerous, and joined with self-styled New York anti-AC crusader Harold P. Brown in a propaganda campaign, aiding Brown in the public electrocution of animals with AC, and supported legislation to control and severely limit AC installations and voltages in what was now being referred to as a "war of the currents". Edison was opposed to capital punishment, but starting in 1887, he began to support the development of an electric chair powered by Westinghouse AC (Note: Edison used the term "Westinghoused" to refer to death by high-voltage alternating current.) in an attempt to smear the AC industry.

Despite his own experiments with AC, Edison was out-competed and AC became the industry standard. He began to be marginalized in his own company. In 1890 he told president Henry Villard he thought it was time to retire from the lighting business. Cut-throat competition and patent battles were bleeding off cash in the competing companies and the idea of a merger was being put forward in financial circles. With the Edison company winning its electric lamp patent infringement cases, Villard began to float the idea of acquiring one of Edison's AC rivals, thereby eliminating many of the further costly patent case and gaining control of that company's AC patents. In 1892 Villard teamed up with J. P. Morgan to engineer a merger of Edison General Electric with its main alternating current based rival, The Thomson-Houston Company. For Villard and Edison General Electric the plan backfired. Morgan decided Thomson-Houston was the more valuable of the two companies, ousted Villard, and put the Thomson-Houston board in charge of the new company, now called General Electric. General Electric now controlled three-quarters of the US electrical business and would compete with Westinghouse for the AC market.

Edison publicly emphasized the financial gain he received from the deal, but privately he had lost interest in the business of illumination. He served as a figurehead on the company's board of directors for a few years before selling his shares.

== Mining ==
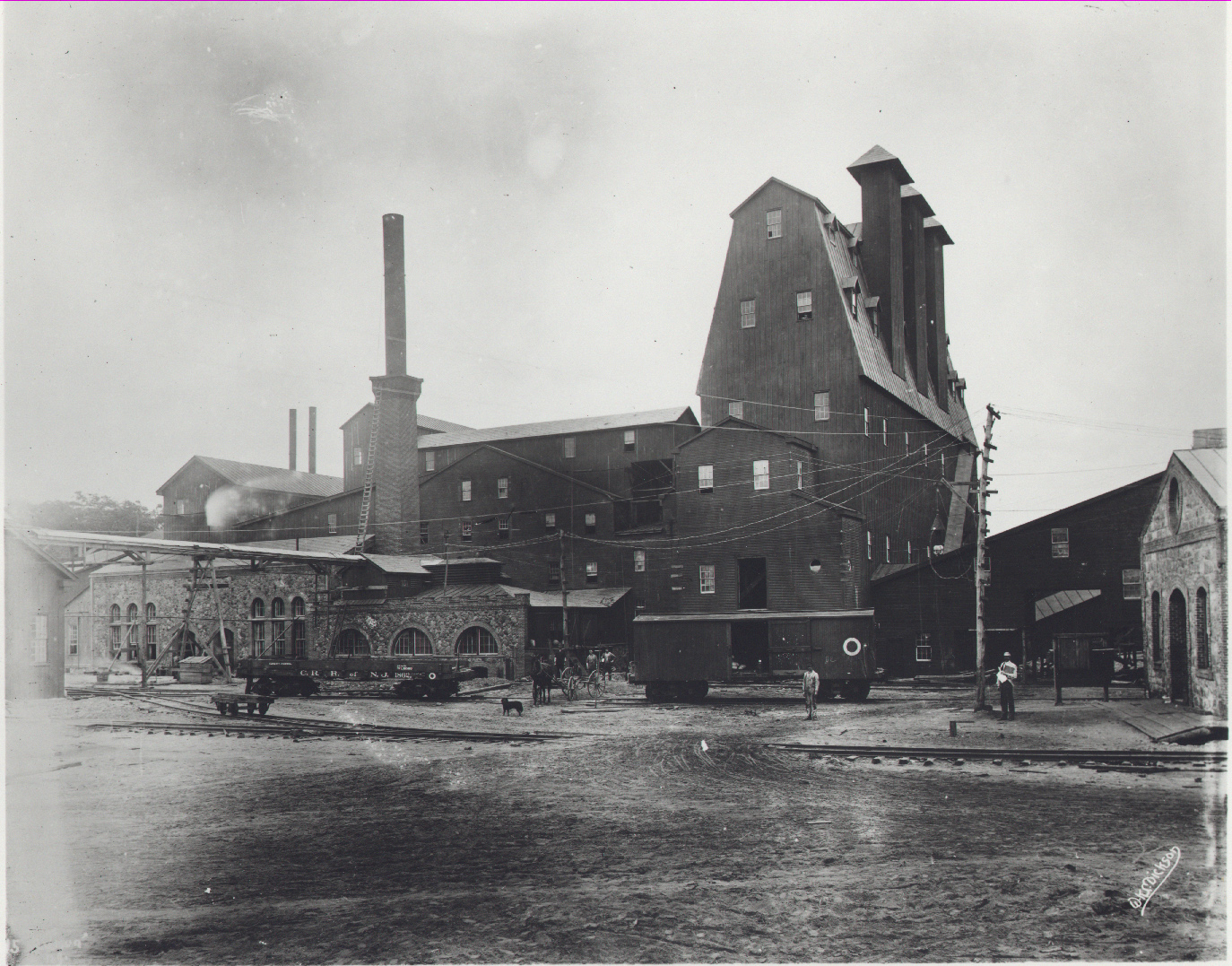
An Edison plant in Ogdensburg, New Jersey, c. 1895

Starting in the late 1870s, Edison became interested in and involved with mining. High-grade iron ore was scarce on the east coast, resulting in high costs as ore was usually shipped from the Midwest. He tried to change this by mining low-grade ore and beach sand. Several others had attempted to improve the refining process by using magnets to separate iron from other metals, but none had been able to do so profitably.

The Edison Ore Milling Company began in 1880 with separating iron out of beach sand. Edison made promises to deliver hundreds of tons of ore a month to several customers, but after three years the operation was shut down and only one customer had received their ore. William Kennedy Dickson and John Birkinbine helped lead the venture. Batchelor and Insull provided some of the capital with Edison taking the majority share financed from his own pocket.

Rather than a complete loss, this first mining venture allowed Edison to license some of the technology to more profitable iron producers. The West Orange team continued to iterate on the technology for years and Edison purchased a mine in Bechtelsville, Pennsylvania. Birkinbine wanted to use this as a demonstration mine to sell the technology to mine owners, but Edison wanted to take over the mining industry himself. Birkinbine was fired in 1890.

Edison bought several mines in the eastern states and began constructing a new centralized mining operation in Ogdensburg, New Jersey. The new process used rollers and crushers that pulverized five ton rocks. To obtain the boulders, Edison purchased the largest steam shovel in America. One novelty of Edison's system was the electrically powered seventy ton rollers which were rotated 3,500 ft (1,100 m) per minute. To protect the system, the roller's gears released at the moment the boulders were dropped in and their momentum crushed the rocks. Edison departed from contemporary, manually intensive, mining practices by prioritizing automation. This meant the rocks journeyed up, down, and across the facility on conveyor belts utilizing gravity, sieves, and additional rollers to separate ore in fines. The fines were recirculated through a magnetic gradient created by an array of 480 electromagnets to select for iron.

Customers would not accept iron with a significant phosphorus content because it ruined the Bessemer process. Edison's system removed the phosphorus with a light pneumatic system that leveraged phosphorus' lower density. Economic forces also dictated that the iron ore be mixed into briquettes for transport and handling at steel mills. Edison advanced the automation of this process and was proud of it taking two hours. The eventual goal was for no humans to touch the iron. Nevertheless, the mine was rapidly losing money.

In 1893, the United States was in a severe recession. Between the capital investments in mining, falling iron prices, and the expensive lifestyle of his wife Mina and children, Edison was at risk of becoming insolvent. He was also unwell as his diabetes was beginning to affect him. He decided to take a loan from his father-in-law.

=== Cement ===
Despite the failure of his mining company, Edison used some of the materials and equipment to produce Portland cement. Manufacturing of iron ore produced a large quantity of waste sand which Edison sold to cement manufacturers. In 1899, he established the Edison Portland Cement Company.

In the manufacturing of Portland cement, the primary ingredient, limestone, is baked at high temperature with the other minerals. Edison designed a novel system which improved the efficiency of this process by baking the cement in horizontal 150-foot-long (46 m) kilns which allowed the cement to achieve the same quality after cooking longer at a lower temperature. This consumed less coal, resulting in saving the amount of manual labor needed to load coal into kilns. Edison reused most of the factory material from the iron extraction process at the Ogden mine to construct his new system. In addition to selling the cement itself, Edison later licensed the proven system to cement manufacturers in America and collected royalties into the 1920s.

Running machines in the dusty environment natural to crushing rocks yielded many problems for the machines. Dynamos in particular were problematic because they could not be sealed off due to the requirement of heat dissipation. Edison responded by inventing a fan cooling system to bring in fresh air to cool the dynamos while sealing them off from the dusty factory air.

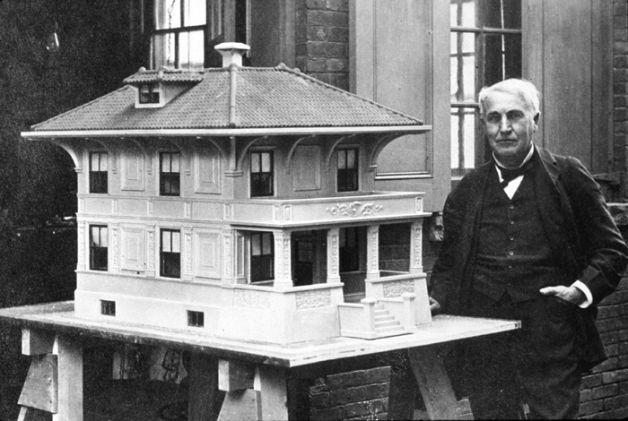
Edison with a model of a concrete house

In 1901, Edison sought to parlay his cement business by starting a cheap housing development initiative. He wanted to create small towns in which every American could afford to buy a home. To bring down the cost of building, he commissioned a system for casting a whole three story house from cement in a single mold. He used this method to build employee housing and made a public relations campaign that did not yield sufficient demand for him to pursue it further.

By 1907, Edison's cement company was a significant entity in domestic industry, but it remained unprofitable due to high competition. Edison tried to cooperate with other cement producers to jointly encourage the use of cement in construction, but the cement business did not become profitable until 1922.

== West Orange ==
=== Moving the works ===
The first labor strike against Edison occurred in the spring of 1886. It was led by D.J. O'Dare of the Edison Tube Works. Manufacturing in New York City was typically performed for nine hours a day, and Edison's employees were among the best paid in the city. However, they were not paid overtime for the additional work that was often performed. The strike sought more pay, overtime pay, and the right to unionize work. Edison and other managers were completely unwilling to negotiate unionization due to the loss of control. By the end of the year, the various manufacturing facilities in the city were closed and centralized as the Edison United Manufacturing Company opened a new factory in Schenectady, New York. The citizens of Schenectady subsidized 16% of the real estate cost to help attract Edison's business to their town.

Samuel Insull began working for Edison in 1881 as a secretary. He had previously worked at Vanity Fair. The two became friends as Insull became a trusted lieutenant. Later, when Mary was dying, Insull helped the family make arrangements. As with all of Edison's men, Insull worked hard. When Edison United Manufacturing Company opened, he was one of two managers.

By 1887, Edison felt he had outgrown Menlo Park. He put Batchelor in charge of constructing a new laboratory complex in West Orange, which when finally constructed was more than ten times the size of the old lab.

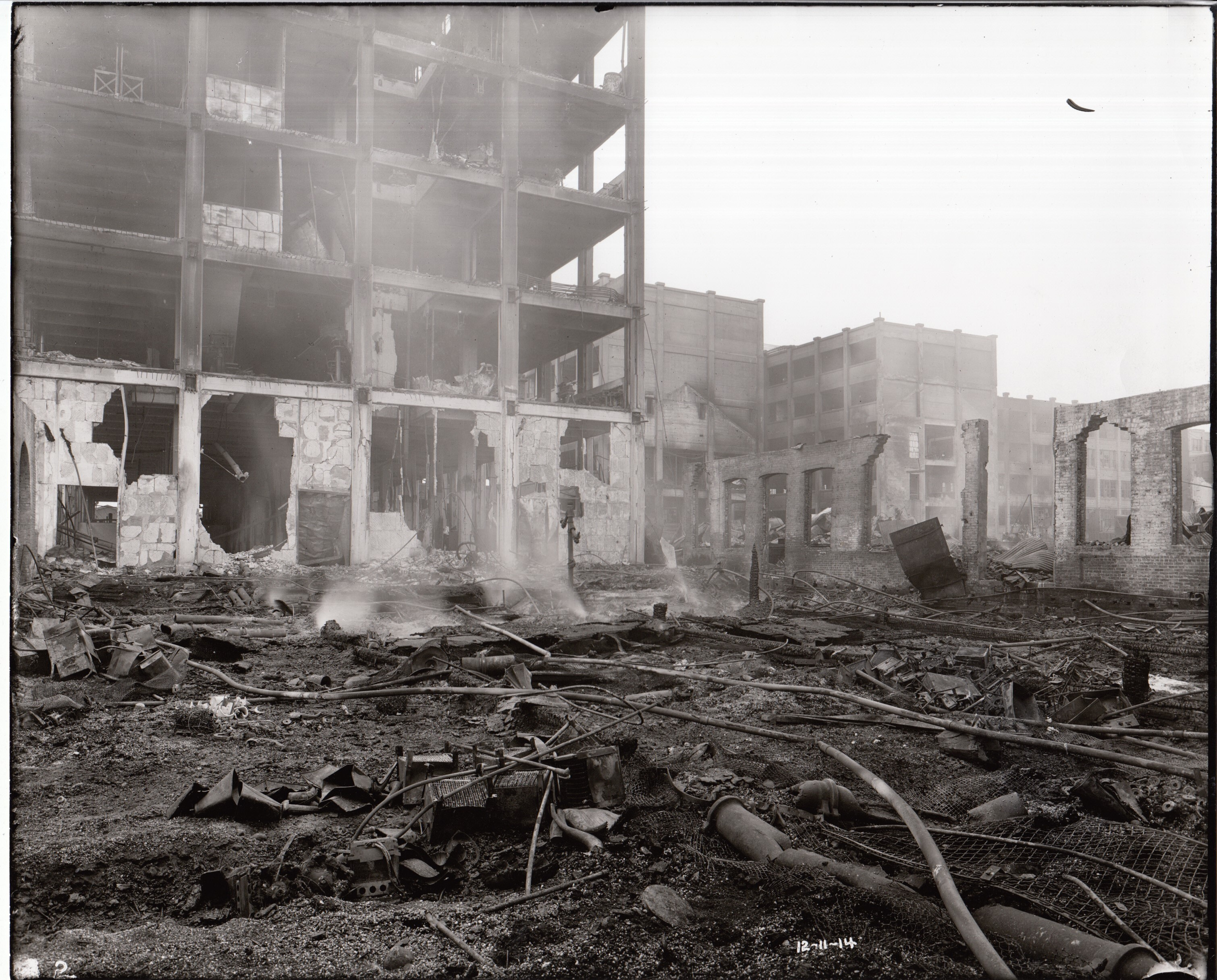
Aftermath of the 1914 fire

In December 1914, a fire killed one employee and destroyed thirteen buildings, causing $1.5 million in damages. The phonograph works was destroyed, but Edison was optimistic about the situation and ordered that everything be rebuilt with the newest technology. They were manufacturing records again by January. The impact of the fire was partially mitigated because the factory practiced regular fire drills.

In 1921, following the inauguration of Warren G. Harding, the American economy was entering a recession. At this point, Edison had experience leading his businesses through recessions and had seen several of his friends go bankrupt when they were unable to manage. He fired thousands of his employees including executives. By the fall, the economy recovered, and business returned; however, it was a near miss with bankruptcy.

=== Fluoroscopy ===
Edison learned about X-rays in 1896, following their discovery by Wilhelm Röntgen. He was sent a photo of Röntgen's hands with the bones visible. The new technology excited Edison and he tried developing an X-ray system with better glass and more electric power than previously used. While experimenting, Edison learned that X-ray images display better on calcium tungstate screens and informed Lord Kelvin.

The fundamental design of Edison's fluoroscope is still in use today, although Edison abandoned the project after nearly losing his own eyesight and seriously injuring his assistants, Clarence Dally and Charles Dally. In 1903, a shaken Edison said: "Don't talk to me about X-rays, I am afraid of them." The brothers often acted as human guinea pigs for the fluoroscopy project. Clarence died, at the age of 39, of injuries related to the exposure.

=== Rechargeable battery ===
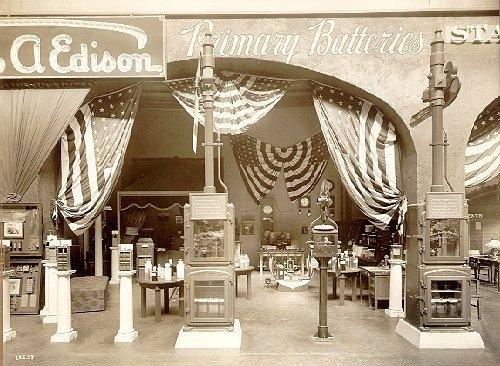
Thomas A. Edison Industries Exhibit, Primary Battery section, in 1915

In 1899, Edison began research for a more efficient rechargeable battery to power electric cars. At the time, lead acid batteries were widely used, but they were inefficient and protected by others' patents. Edison decided to pursue an alkaline battery; his lab tested 10,000 combinations of electrodes and solutions, eventually settling on a nickel-iron combination.

Waldemar Jungner simultaneously worked on a similar design which Edison likely knew about. Edison and Junger litigated over their respective intellectual property as Edison attempted to commercialize his battery. Edison obtained a US and European patent for his nickel–iron battery in 1901 and founded the Edison Storage Battery Company. In 1904, Edison was worried about losing the patent fight and personally petitioned president Theodore Roosevelt to step in. Roosevelt obliged; however, the patent office still denied Edison's claim.

By 1904, the Edison Storage Battery Company had 450 employees. The first rechargeable batteries they produced were for electric cars. A total recall was issued due to the batteries losing power after several recharge cycles.

Henry Ford first met Edison in 1896, while working for the Edison Illuminating Company. Edison encouraged Ford's nascent automobile tinkering and Ford resigned in 1899 to start his first motor company. By 1908, with the Model T on the road, gasoline cars were taking over the market. Edison did not demonstrate a mature battery until 1910: a very efficient and durable nickel-iron-battery with lye as the electrolyte. The nickel–iron battery was never very successful; by the time it was ready, electric cars were disappearing, and lead acid batteries had become the standard for starting gas-powered cars. Ford was still enamored with Edison and lent him $1.1 million ($35.4 million in 2025) to finance further battery research, but Edison was unable to bring a sufficient battery to market.

== Motion pictures ==
The Leonard–Cushing Fight in June 1894; each of the six one-minute rounds recorded by the Kinetoscope was made available to exhibitors for $22.50. Customers who watched the final round saw Leonard score a knockdown.

While working on the mining project, in 1888, Edison and William Kennedy Laurie Dickson began trying to make a camera "to do for the eye what the phonograph does for the ear". They may have been inspired by Eadweard Muybridge. Edison focused on the electromechanical elements while Dickson led the optical and film effort. Edison was granted a patent for a motion picture camera, labeled the "Kinetograph" in 1897. Much of the credit for the invention belongs to Dickson. A prototype film camera was constructed, using 19mm film with round images, and the first successful tests with it were publicly seen on May 20, 1891, in a simple viewer.

In fact, Edison was aiming for a bigger prize than a motion picture camera: he wanted a kinetophonograph to capture motion picture and record sounds with synchronized playback. In the spring of 1890, Dickson attempted the first film with sound starring himself. However, keeping the sound and video synchronized proved to be very difficult and Edison shelved commercial development of the technology.

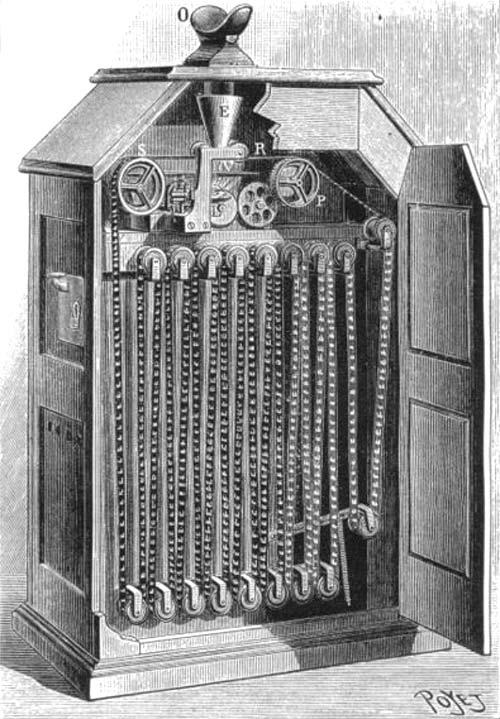
Interior view of Kinetoscope with peephole viewer at top of cabinet

In 1891, Edison built a Kinetoscope or peep-hole viewer. This device was installed in penny arcades, where people could watch short, simple films. The kinetograph and kinetoscope were both first publicly exhibited May 20, 1891. By 1895, Dickson was beginning to set up business for himself separate from Edison. The exact motivation for the split is unknown but likely stemmed from disagreements between the two.

In April 1896, Thomas Armat reached a deal with Edison in which Edison's company manufactured and sold the Vitascope to project films produced in Edison's film studio. It was advertised as an Edison invention to boost sales, but was in fact, the invention of Armat and C. Francis Jenkins. Edison had attempted unsuccessfully to make his own projector, but acknowledged the Vitascope was better at that time.

Edison's film studio made nearly 1,200 films from 1894 to 1911. The majority of the productions were short films showing everything from acrobats to parades to fire calls including titles such as Fred Ott's Sneeze (1894), The Kiss (1896), The Great Train Robbery (1903), Alice's Adventures in Wonderland (1910), and the first Frankenstein film (1910). Edison was happy to have Edwin S. Porter run the creative side of the movie business. In 1903, the owners of Luna Park, Coney Island, announced they would execute Topsy the elephant. Edison Manufacturing filmed the animal's death by alternating current, producing the motion picture Electrocuting an Elephant.

A Day with Thomas Edison (1922)

In 1908, Edison started the Motion Picture Patents Company, which was a conglomerate of nine major film studios (commonly known as the Edison Trust).

In 1913, movies used live actors and bands to add sound to the experience. However, Edison was again feeling confident in his kinetophone (Note: From 1890 to 1913 Edison and Dickson did not maintain consistent terminology to refer to the motion picture and sound technology they developed.) technology to synchronize recorded sound and motion picture playback. Simultaneously, Leon Gaumont was developing similar technology. Both their systems required a skilled projectionist who could adjust the video speed for the sound playback so that the audio and video would be synchronized.

In 1914, Edison fired Porter for unclear reasons. The technical aspects of silent, black and white film were mostly solved and the storytelling did not capture the inventor's interest. The kinetophone was hard to sell due to the difficulty in operating it. Edison's movie business began to decline.

Edison said his favorite movie was The Birth of a Nation. He thought that talkies had "spoiled everything" for him. "There isn't any good acting on the screen. They concentrate on the voice now and have forgotten how to act. I can sense it more than you because I am deaf." His favorite stars were Mary Pickford and Clara Bow.

== National security ==
Due to the security concerns around World War I, Edison suggested forming a science and industry committee to provide advice and research to the US military, and he headed the Naval Consulting Board in 1915. However, he attended few of the meetings due to his deafness. One of the board's main tasks was to prepare a site to conduct research for the navy. Edison wanted to locate the site far from Washington DC, as too many visits from bureaucrats would slow down the research. However, he was not listened to by the other board members and turned his focus to experiments in military technology.

=== Submarines ===
At the start of the war, Edison attempted several methods for improving submarine detection which failed to gain adoption by the Navy. He allowed Miller Hutchinson to promote his battery technology as a safer solution to lead battery power on submarines. An American submarine crew had suffered serious injuries due to one such battery leaking sulfuric acid which mixed with seawater to produce chlorine gas inside the vessel. However, the nickel-iron batteries, used by Edison, leaked hydrogen gas. This was not a problem in automobiles, but confined in a submarine it could become explosive. In January 1916, while undergoing maintenance with the new Edison test battery there was a hydrogen explosion inside the USS E-2 which killed five men. Edison and Hutchinson defended their battery, stating that the explosion was due to operator error. However, many naval officials blamed Edison and Hutchinson for overselling the battery. The event derailed sales of the battery but did not destroy Edison's good standing with the navy.

=== Rubber ===
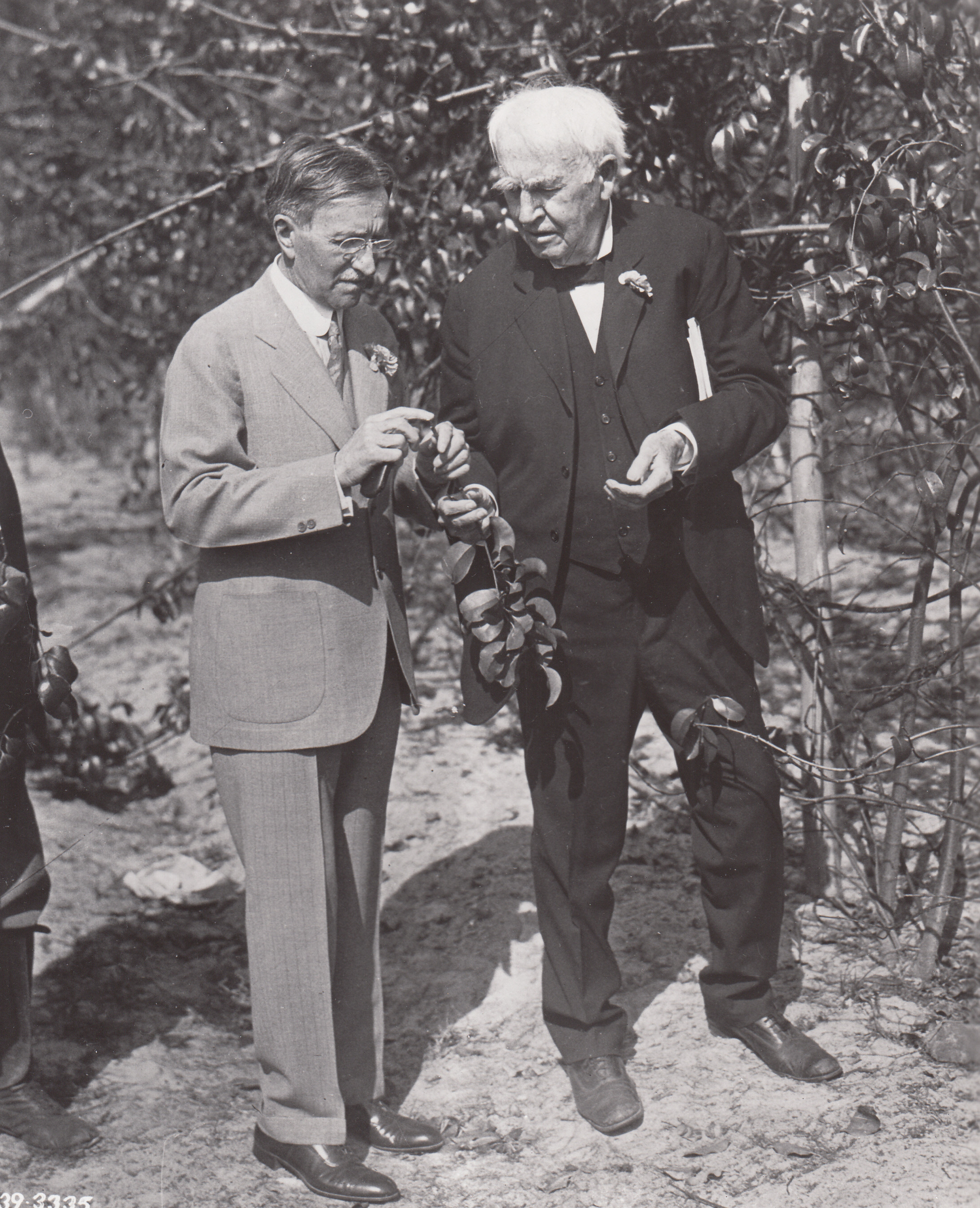
Edison and Harvey S. Firestone examining a rubber plant on Edison's 81st birthday

In 1915, the United States consumed 75% of the world's rubber but produced a negligible amount. Edison, and many other businessmen, became concerned with America's reliance on foreign supply of rubber. Domestic fears were realized when the British Stevenson Plan was introduced in 1921, which involved restricting rubber supply in order to increase rubber prices. Edison raised money from his friends Ford and Firestone for botanical research into a new rubber source. He used his 80th birthday to give tours of his experimental garden.

After testing 17,000 plant samples, he eventually found an adequate source in the Goldenrod plant. Near the end of 1929, Edison announced Solidago leavenworthii, also known as Leavenworth's Goldenrod, could be bred to give a 12% latex yield. Edison employed systematic problem solving to rubber production. He rejected other plants based on combinations of their latex content, the extraction processes needed to get the latex from the plant, where the latex is found in the plants, growth speed, and ability to harvest the plant.

=== Chemicals ===
Edison licensed Condensite from another chemist which was formed from the condensation of phenol and formaldehyde. This chemical coating was used on the phonograph records to make them significantly more durable. The records used several other chemicals in the production process. The start of World War I created a broad chemical shortage which threatened the business.

Edison responded by undertaking production of phenol at his Silver Lake facility using processes developed by his chemists. He built two plants with a capacity of six tons of phenol per day. Production began the first week of September, one month after hostilities began in Europe. He built two plants to produce raw material benzene at Johnstown, Pennsylvania, and Bessemer, Alabama. Another plant near Bessemer manufactured the aniline dyes Germany had previously held a monopoly on. The shortages made these ventures profitable.

== Final years ==
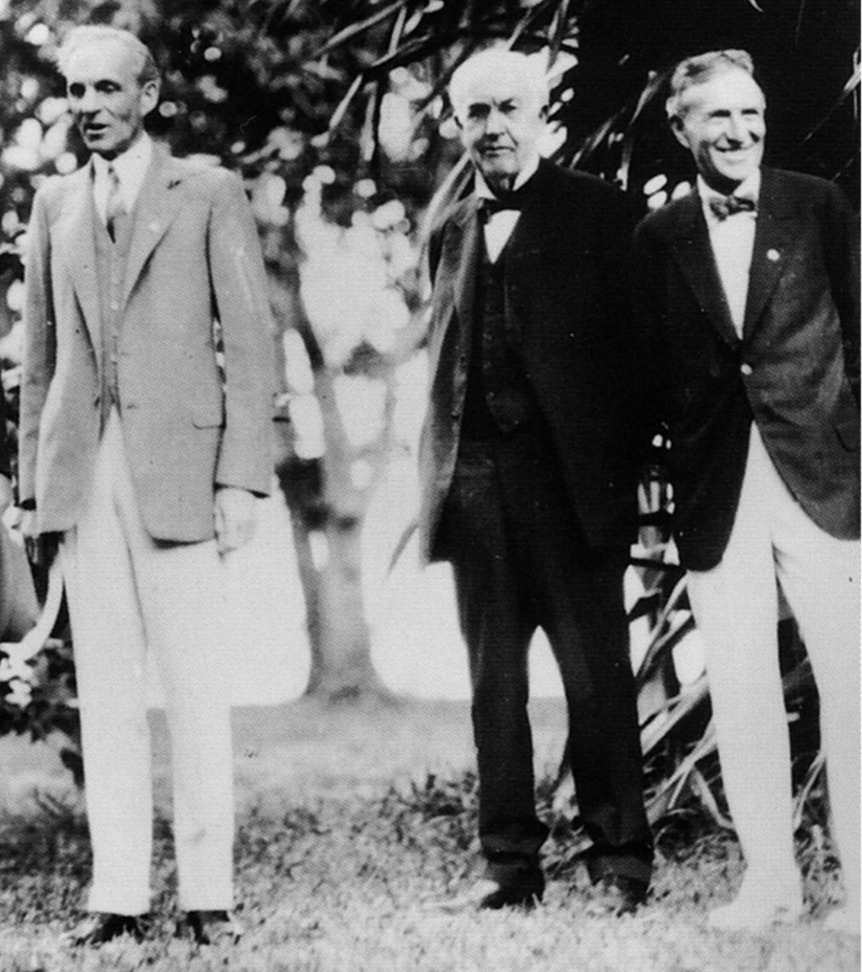
From left to right: Henry Ford, Edison, and Harvey S. Firestone in Fort Myers, Florida, in 1929

Edison and Henry Ford were friends until Edison's death; Ford lived a few hundred feet away from Edison at his winter retreat in Fort Myers. They undertook annual motor camping trips from 1914 to 1924, also with Harvey Firestone and naturalist John Burroughs. The trips functioned as a moving advertisement for Ford cars, Firestone tires, and whatever Edison had going on at the time. A team of reporters joined to ensure word spread. In 1926, at 79 years old, Edison handed over the presidency of Thomas A. Edison, Inc. to his son Charles.

=== Death ===
In the final years of his life, Edison continued to chew tobacco daily and his diabetes worsened. Edison died on October 18, 1931, at Glenmont and was buried on the property.

Upon Edison's death, his son Charles Edison requested that several test tubes near him be sealed. One of these was sent to Henry Ford, being labelled as "Edison's last breath". The test tube is on display at the Henry Ford Museum.

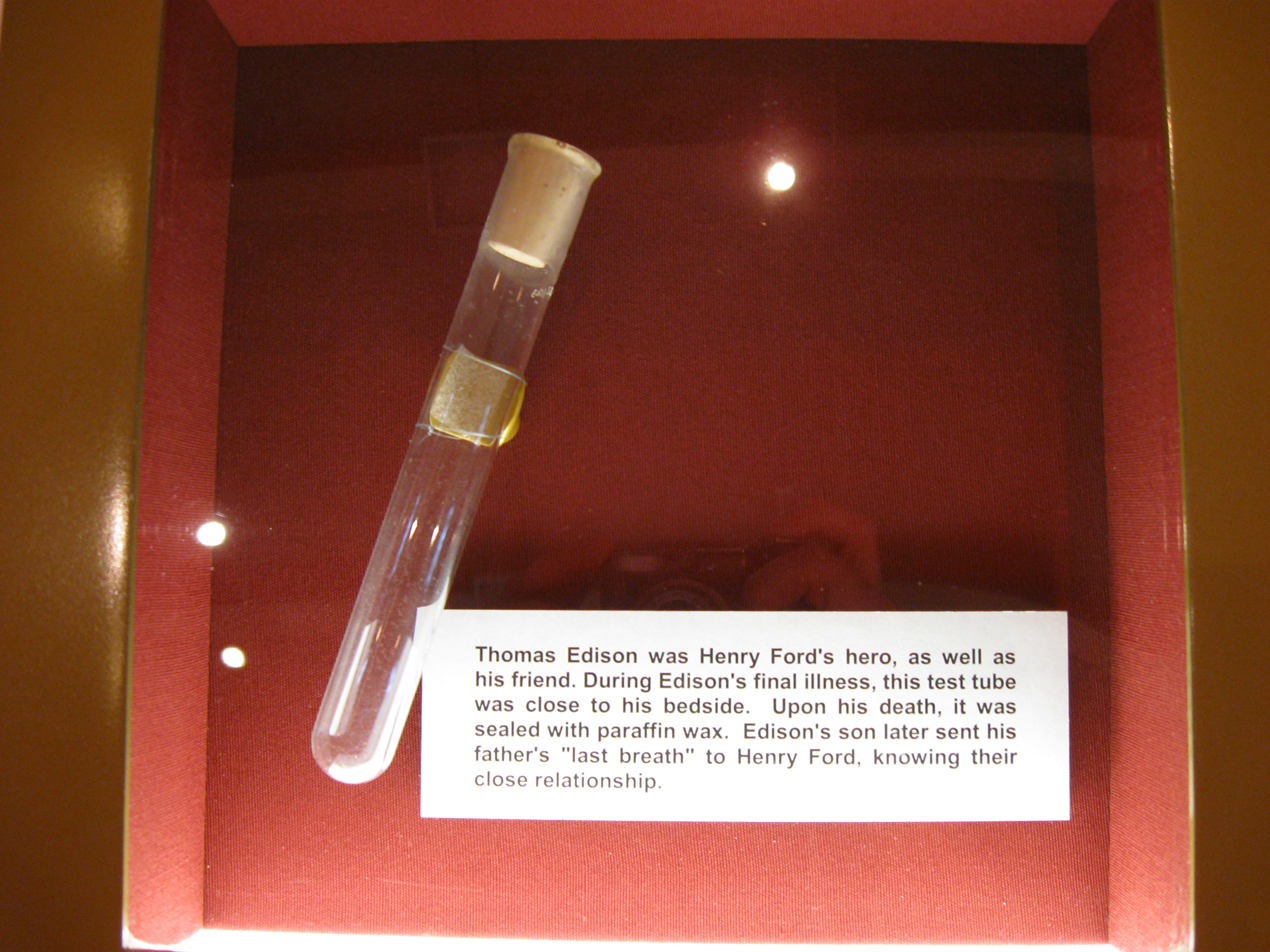
Museum display of Edison's last breath

For two days Edison's body lied in state in his library in West Orange, where people could pay their respects. On the second day, an estimated 40,000 people visited his body. On October 21, 1931, for a minute at 9:59 pm Eastern Standard Time, millions of lights were turned off throughout the United States for a minute to pay tribute. An estimated one tenth of New York City's lights were turned off. The city also had the torch of the Statue of Liberty darkened and subway lines halted. This commemoration was done at the request of President Herbert Hoover.

== Family ==
=== Mary ===
On December 25, 1871, at the age of 24, Edison married 16-year-old Mary Stilwell (1855–1884), whom he had met two months earlier; she was an employee at one of his shops. They had three children: (Note: Marion and Thomas Jr. were nicknamed Dot and Dash respectively.)

- Marion Estelle Edison (1873–1965)
- Thomas Alva Edison Jr. (1876–1935)
- William Leslie Edison (1878–1937)

Edison generally preferred spending time in the laboratory to being with his family. When the Edisons moved to New York, they lived beside Gramercy Park. Edison neglected his wife after the first few years of their marriage. She enjoyed shopping for fashionable gowns, and attending balls. By 1882, Mary's mental health was highly concerning to her doctor. Mary Edison died at age 29 on August 9, 1884, of unknown causes.

=== Thomas Jr. ===
Thomas Jr. was often sick as a child, but Edison left his care in Mary's hands.

Wanting to be an inventor, but not having much of an aptitude for it, Thomas Jr. became a problem for his father and his father's business. Starting in the 1890s, Thomas Jr. became involved in snake oil products and shady and fraudulent enterprises. The situation became so bad that Thomas Sr. had to deal with his son through attorneys and agreed to pay Thomas Jr. an allowance in exchange for not using the Edison name. He struggled with problematic drinking and depression. Thomas Jr. had a disastrous one year marriage, which began in 1899 and caused scandal for himself and the senior Edison.

=== Mina ===
Thomas met Mina Miller at the World Cotton Centennial in December 1884. She was the daughter of the inventor Lewis Miller, who had made significant personal wealth by selling a wheat mower for which he had invented several improvements. He was a co-founder of the Chautauqua Institution, and a benefactor of Methodist charities. Mina enjoyed the socialite lifestyle and practiced a strict Methodist faith her whole life. She was a family friend of the Gillilands' and Edison met her several times in 1885 while working on a project with Ezra in Boston. He joined her for the Chautauqua gathering in 1885, but their flirting was dampened by the religious nature of the gathering. He proposed to her after the two took a trip in September.

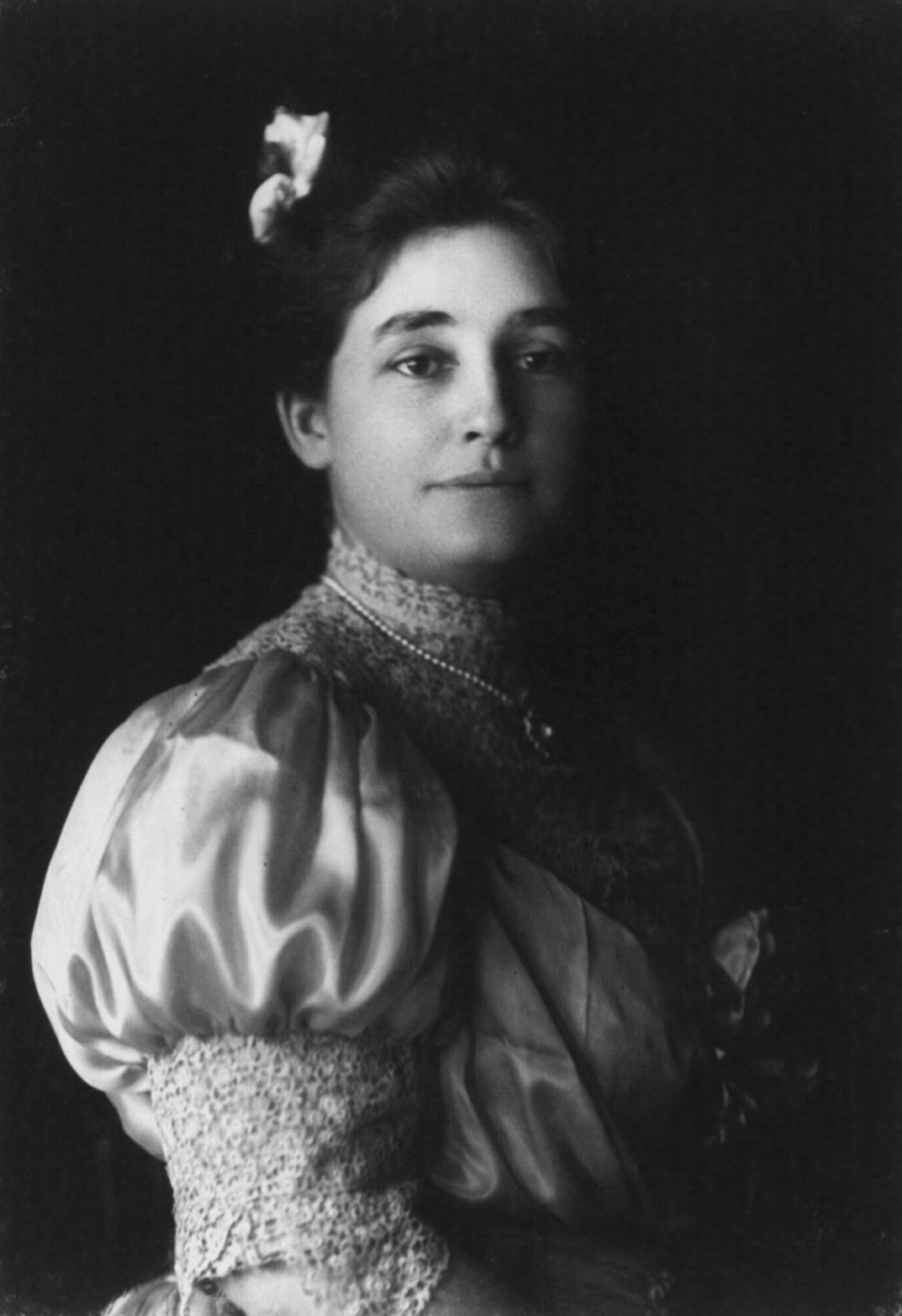
Mina Miller Edison in 1906

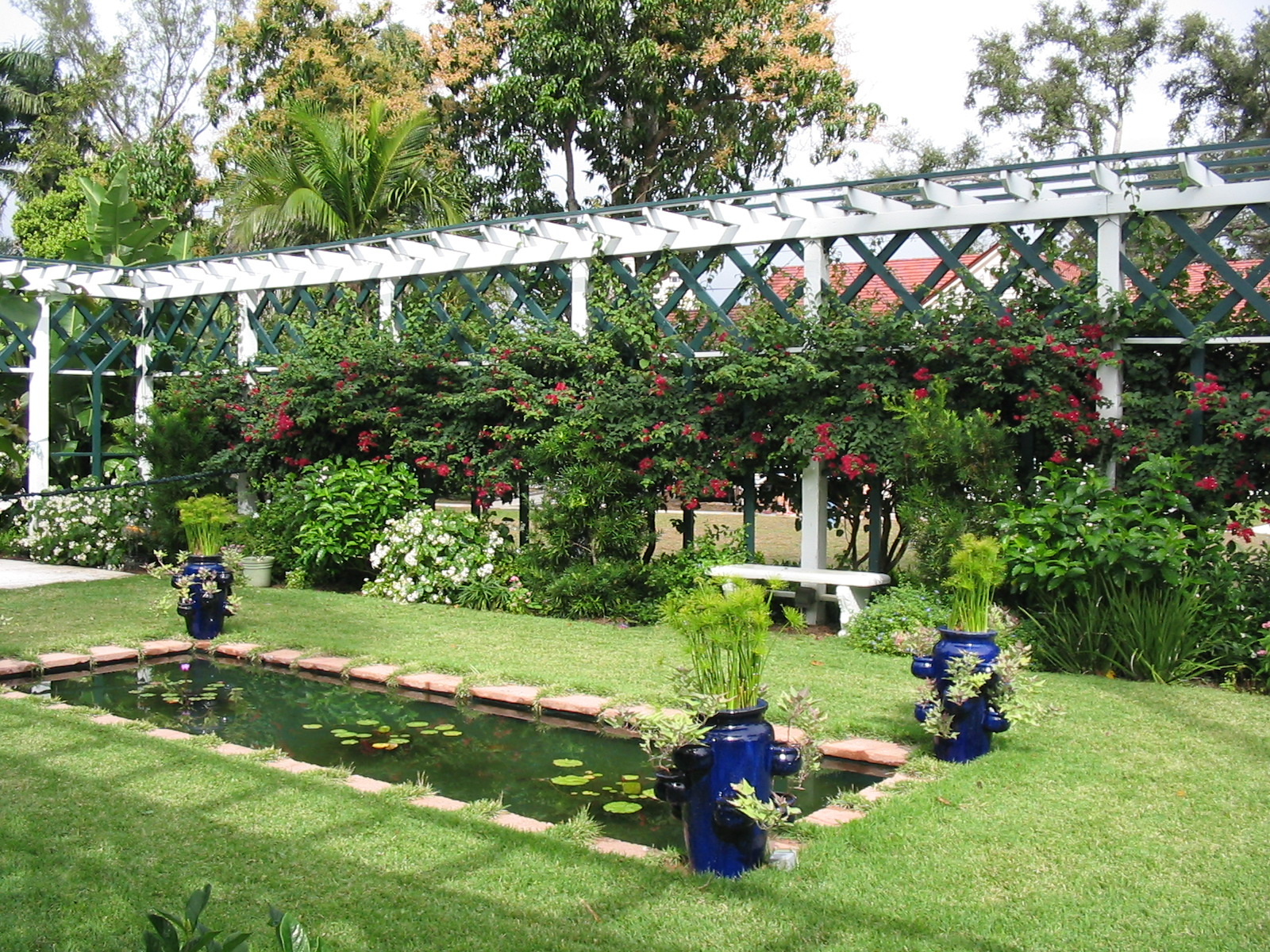
Mina Edison's Moonlight Garden in 2007

On February 24, 1886, at the age of 39, Edison married the 20-year-old Mina Miller (1865–1947) in Akron, Ohio. They had three children:

- Madeleine Edison (1888–1979)
- Charles Edison (1890–1969)
- Theodore Miller Edison (1898–1992)

Marion, Thomas's eldest daughter, often came to the laboratory at Menlo park during her childhood. As an adult, she did not get along with Mina and moved to Germany in 1894. She returned in 1924, after divorcing her unfaithful husband.

According to Tesla:

If Edison had not married a woman of exceptional intelligence, who made it the one object of her life to preserve him, he would have died many years ago from consequences of sheer neglect.

In his second marriage he was also often neglectful of his wife and children. When he was around, he was extremely controlling. He left nearly every aspect of housekeeping and child rearing to Mina and her five maids. One exception was the Fourth of July: being deaf, Edison enjoyed the very loud booms made by fireworks. He made his own fireworks into which he added a small amount of TNT. Edison wrote Mina love letters about missing her while he was away for extended periods.

Madeleine stated she had few childhood memories of her father, and he was typically only home once a week during her childhood. She married John Eyre Sloane.

Theodore was named after Mina's brother, who died in the Spanish–American War shortly before she gave birth. Theodore went on to study physics at Massachusetts Institute of Technology (MIT). After working for Charles while their father stepped down, Theodore decided to become an independent inventor running his own lab.

Charles studied general science at MIT and took over his father's business after his death. Later he served one term as Governor of New Jersey (1941–1944).

== Personal life ==
=== Health ===
In December, Edison was housebound due to pleurisy. He recovered, but by May 1887 he needed emergency surgery to treat abscesses below his ear. He had surgeries there again in 1906 and 1908. He was completely deaf in one ear and barely hearing in the other. Edison had diabetes.

=== Property ===
In 1885, Edison bought 13 acres of property in Fort Myers, Florida, for roughly $2,750 (equivalent to $98,542 in 2025) and built what was later called Seminole Lodge as a winter retreat. Edison purchased a home known as Glenmont in 1886, in Llewellyn Park in West Orange, New Jersey. He sold it to Mina in 1891. Edison liked boats, cars, and fishing. He drove only on very limited occasions, but, for research purposes, owned several cars which helped him bond with his son Charles, who he encouraged to drive even as a child.

== Views ==
=== Religion and metaphysics ===
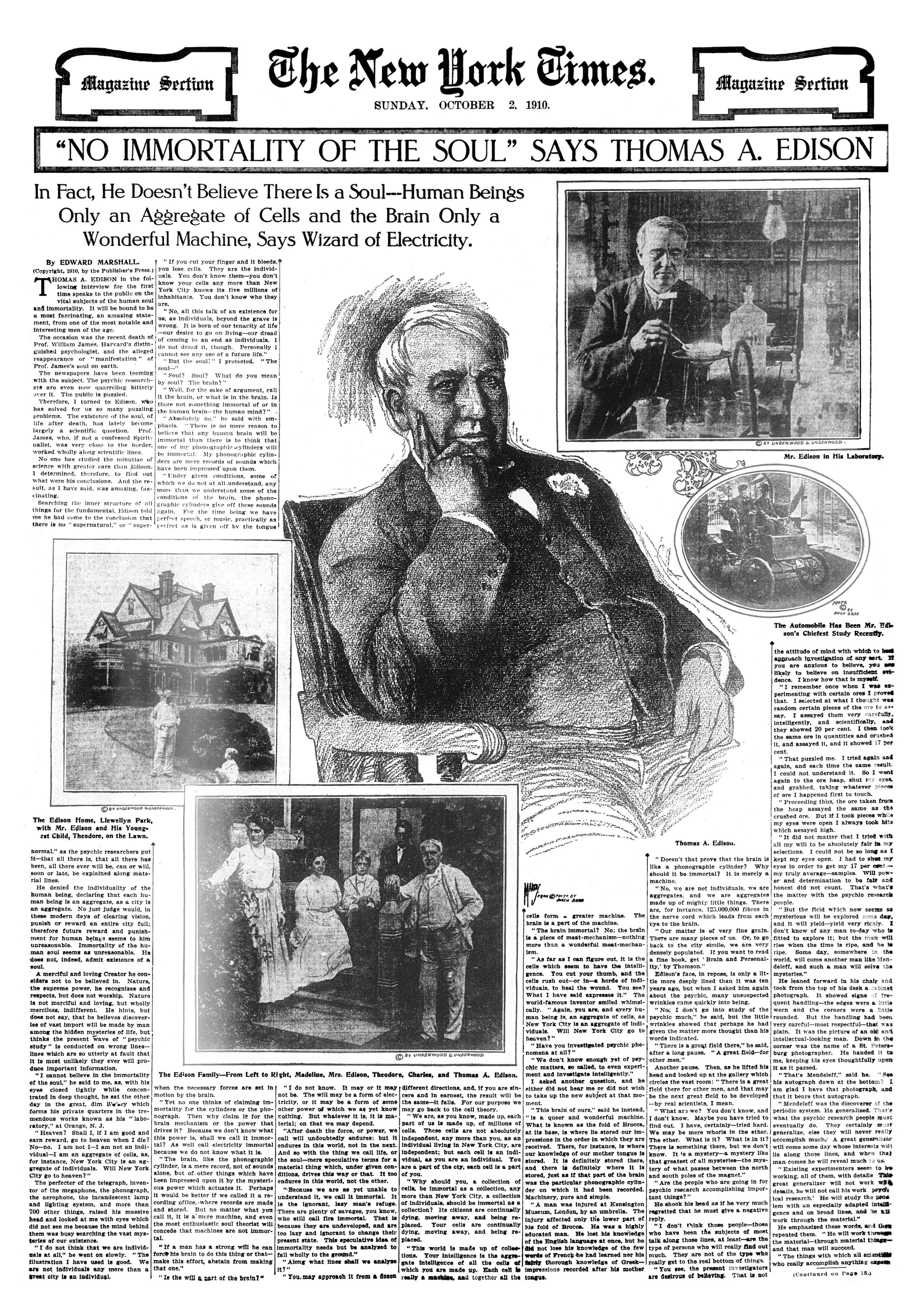
This 1910 New York Times Magazine feature states that "Nature, the supreme power, [Edison] recognizes and respects, but does not worship. Nature is not merciful and loving, but wholly merciless, indifferent." Edison is quoted as saying "I am not an individual—I am an aggregate of cells, as, for instance, New York City is an aggregate of individuals. Will New York City go to heaven?"

Historian Paul Israel has characterized Edison as a "freethinker". Edison was heavily influenced by Thomas Paine's The Age of Reason. Edison defended Paine's "scientific deism", saying, "He has been called an atheist, but atheist he was not. Paine believed in a supreme intelligence, as representing the idea which other men often express by the name of deity." In an October 2, 1910, interview Edison stated:

Nature is what we know. We do not know the gods of religions. And nature is not kind, or merciful, or loving. If God made me—the fabled God of the three qualities of which I spoke: mercy, kindness, love—He also made the fish I catch and eat. And where do His mercy, kindness, and love for that fish come in? No; nature made us—nature did it all—not the gods of the religions.

Edison was labeled an atheist for those remarks, and although he did not allow himself to be drawn into the controversy publicly, he clarified himself in a private letter:

You have misunderstood the whole article, because you jumped to the conclusion that it denies the existence of God. There is no such denial, what you call God I call Nature, the Supreme intelligence that rules matter. All the article states is that it is doubtful in my opinion if our intelligence or soul or whatever one may call it lives hereafter as an entity or disperses back again from whence it came, scattered amongst the cells of which we are made.

Edison explored and promoted ideas in panpsychism.

=== Politics ===
Edison's father was a Democrat who supported the secession of the Confederate States of America. Edison was a lifelong Republican, but he briefly supported Theodore Roosevelt in his third attempt at the presidency as a Progressive Party candidate. He liked the Republican party's support of industrial capitalism and tariffs.

Edison met several presidents. He met Rutherford B. Hayes in 1879 to demonstrate the phonograph, and met Benjamin Harrison in 1890. In 1921, Edison met Harding with the Firestone, Ford summer caravan. He met Calvin Coolidge in 1924 at the president's home in Vermont. In 1928, Edison received the Congressional Gold Medal and Coolidge called into the ceremony via radio. Herbert Hoover met Edison in 1929 at Seminole Lodge. Ten months later, Hoover traveled with Edison and Ford to Ford's reconstruction of Menlo Park.

Edison was a supporter of women's suffrage. He said in 1915, "Every woman in this country is going to have the vote." His employment of women was somewhat notable at the time. He assigned women factory jobs that required nimble fingers, like making the brush wires for dynamos.

Edison spoke negatively about what he saw as belligerent nationalism in Europe.

== Awards ==
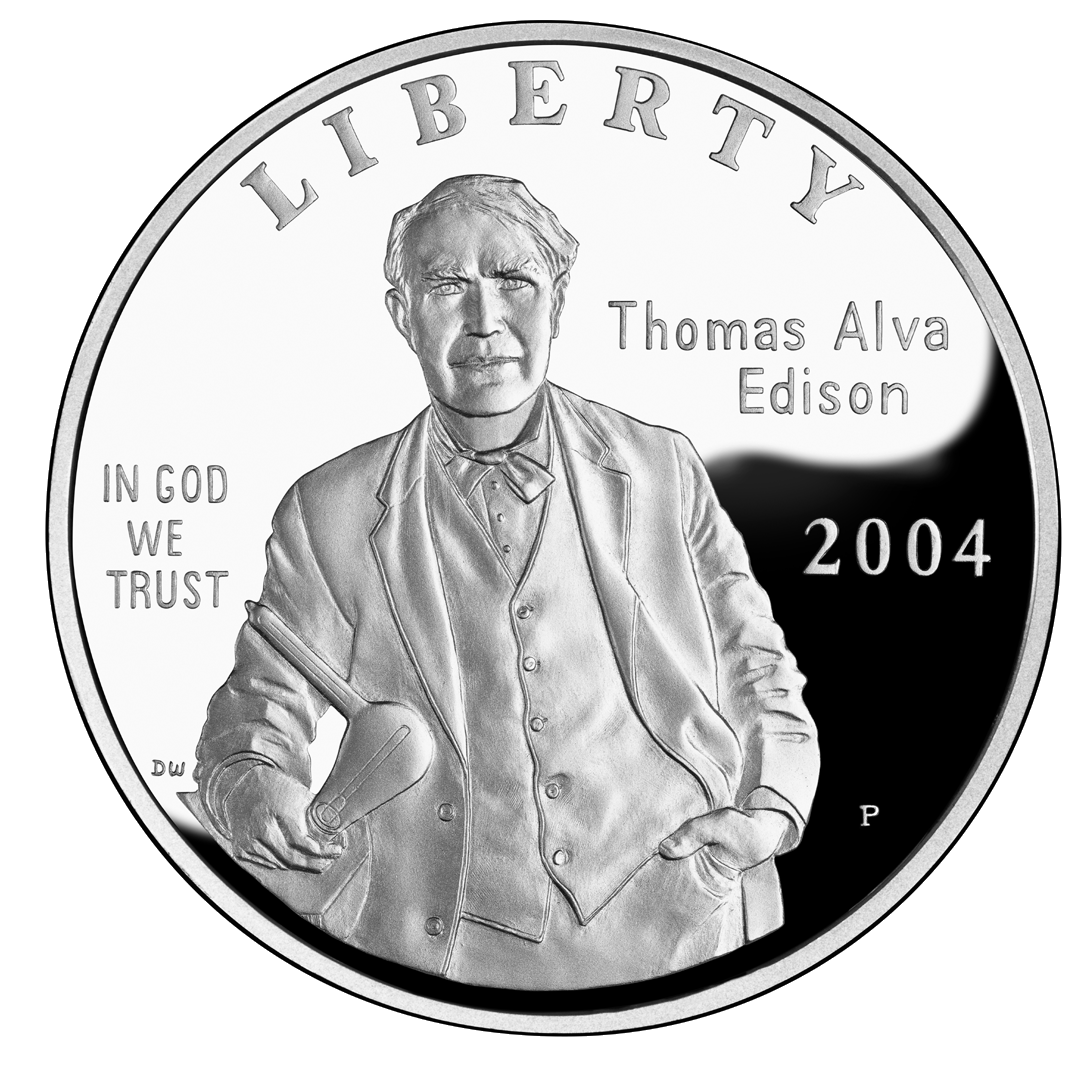
The 2004 Thomas Alva Edison silver dollar commemorated the 125th anniversary of the invention of the light bulb.

The following is an incomplete list of awards given to Edison during his lifetime:

- In 1878, honorary PhD from Union College
- On November 10, 1881, Officer of the Legion of Honour
- In 1892, Manchester Literary and Philosophical Society
- In 1889, the John Scott Medal
- In 1899, the Edward Longstreth Medal of The Franklin Institute
- In 1904, elected an honorary member of the American Society of Mechanical Engineers
- In 1908, John Fritz Medal
- In 1915, Franklin Medal of The Franklin Institute
- In 1920, the Navy Distinguished Service Medal. (Note: Edison declined because he believed he did not do more for the navy than persons in similar roles.)
- In 1923, the Edison Medal of the American Institute of Electrical Engineers
- In 1927, the American Philosophical Society member
- On May 29, 1928, the Congressional Gold Medal

== See also ==
- Edison Pioneers – a group formed in 1918 by employees and other associates of Edison
- Thomas Edison in popular culture
- List of things named after Thomas Edison

== Bibliography ==
=== Books ===
- Adair, Gene (1996). Thomas Alva Edison : Inventing the Electric Age. Oxford University Press. ISBN 0195087992.
- Baldwin, Neil (1995). Edison: Inventing the Century. Hyperion. ISBN 978-0-226-03571-0.
- Bradley, Robert l. Jr (2011). Edison to Enron. John Wiley & Sons. ISBN 978-1-118-19251-1. Archived from the original on May 11, 2021 – via Google Books.
- Conot, Robert (1979). A Streak of Luck. Seaview Books. ISBN 978-0-87223-521-2.
- Fletcher, Seth (May 10, 2011). Bottled Lightning: Superbatteries, Electric Cars, and the New Lithium Economy. Macmillan + ORM. ISBN 978-1-4299-2291-3 – via Google Books.
- Hughes, Thomas Parke (March 1993). Networks of Power: Electrification in Western Society, 1880–1930. JHU Press. ISBN 978-0-8018-4614-4 – via Google Books.
- Israel, Paul (1998). Edison: A Life of Invention. Wiley. ISBN 978-0-471-52942-2.
- Jonnes, Jill (2003). Empires of Light: Edison, Tesla, Westinghouse, And the Race to Electrify the World. Random House. ISBN 978-0-375-50739-7.
- Klein, Maury (2009). The power makers : steam, electricity, and the men who invented modern America. New York : Bloomsbury Press. ISBN 978-1-59691-677-7.
- Morris, Edmund (October 22, 2019). Edison. Random House. ISBN 081299311X.
- Rockman, Howard B. (July 26, 2004). Intellectual Property Law for Engineers and Scientists. John Wiley & Sons. ISBN 0471697397.
- Rossell, Deac (2022). Chronology of the birth of cinema: 1833-1896. New Barnet: John Libbey Publishing. ISBN 978-0-86196-716-2.

=== Web sources ===
- Han, Yoonji (December 2, 2023). "Thomas Edison Tried to Take Credit for a Device Created by a Black American Inventor". Business Insider. Archived from the original on August 29, 2025.
- Israel, Paul (August 3, 2012). "Edison's Laboratory". The Gilder Lehrman Institute of American History. Archived from the original on February 25, 2013.
- Markel, Howard (October 22, 2018). "The medical mystery that helped make Thomas Edison an inventor". PBS. Archived from the original on July 20, 2020.
- "Thomas Alva Edison – Acknowledgement". The Franklin Institute. Archived from the original on January 7, 2013.
- "Edison's Foreign Patents". Rutgers University.

== Primary sources ==
- US 203018, Edison, Thomas A., "Telephones or speaking-telegraphs", published April 30, 1878
- US 307031, Edison, Thomas A., "Electrical Indicator", published October 21, 1884
- The Thomas A. Edison Papers Digital Edition
- The Papers of Thomas A. Edison, book edition in 9 volumes; each can be downloaded at no cost
  - volume 1 18471873 online; also download vol 1
  - volume 2 1873–1876 online; also download vol 2
- Edison, Thomas Alva (June 7, 1925). "The Philosophy of Thomas Paine". thomaspaine.org. Archived from the original on February 9, 2026.
