= Ezra Gilliland =

American inventor

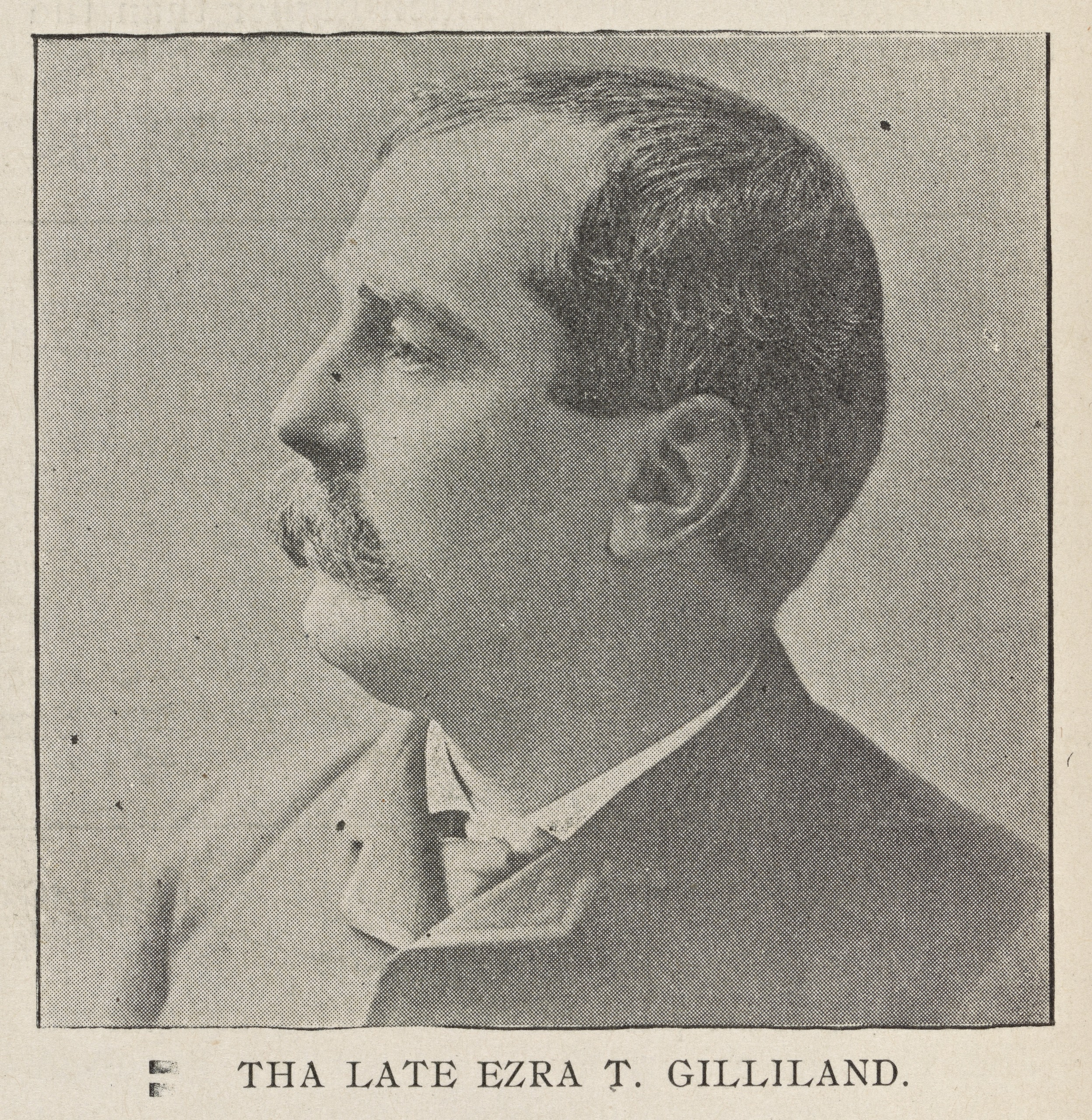
- Image of Ezra T Gilliland from Telegraph and Telephone Age (1903)
- Born: Ezra Torrance Gilliland; June 17, 1845; Cuba, New York, U.S.
- Died: May 13, 1903 (aged 57)

Ezra Torrance Gilliland (June 17, 1845 – May 13, 1903) was an inventor who designed the telephone switchboard and the magneto bell. Gilliland had a laboratory in his home and "kept seven expert electricians employed" as he worked on his ideas. He built the first telephone exchange in Indianapolis in the 1870s under the name Gilliland Telephone Manufacturing Company and later worked for the Bell Telephone Company.

Gilliland was a friend and colleague of Thomas Edison and the two worked together on many projects. They met as young men and called each other "Damon and Pythias" because of their close friendship. Edison met his second wife at Gilliland's home. Gilliland wrote frequently in trade journals promoting Edison's inventions. The two were business partners, even occupying adjacent vacation homes in Fort Myers, Florida, until 1889 when they had a falling out over business dealings.

== Personal life ==
Gilliland was born in Cuba, New York. He married Lillian M. Johnson. They moved to Pelham, New York in the early 1890s.
