= Richard Green Parker =

American educator and textbook writer

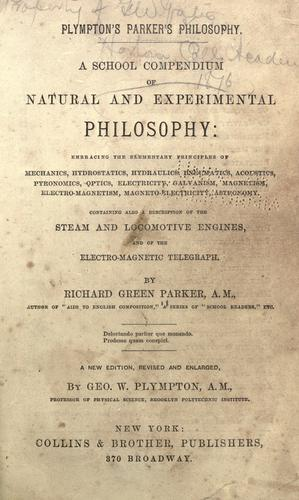
Richard Green Parker's Natural Philosophy work.

Richard Green Parker (December 25, 1798 – September 25, 1869) was an American educator and a history and textbook writer.

== Biography ==
Born in Boston, he was the son of Episcopal clergyman Samuel Parker, who was appointed bishop of Massachusetts toward the end of his life, but never served in that capacity. Richard Green Parker graduated from Harvard in 1817. His subsequent life was devoted to education, chiefly in New England. He was not only a thorough practical teacher in grammar schools, and a private school of his own, but was also a voluminous author of textbooks.

== Works ==
=== Textbooks ===
- Natural Philosophy (1837)
- Aids to English Composition (Boston, 1832)
- National Series of Readers, with James M. Watson (completed in 1858)
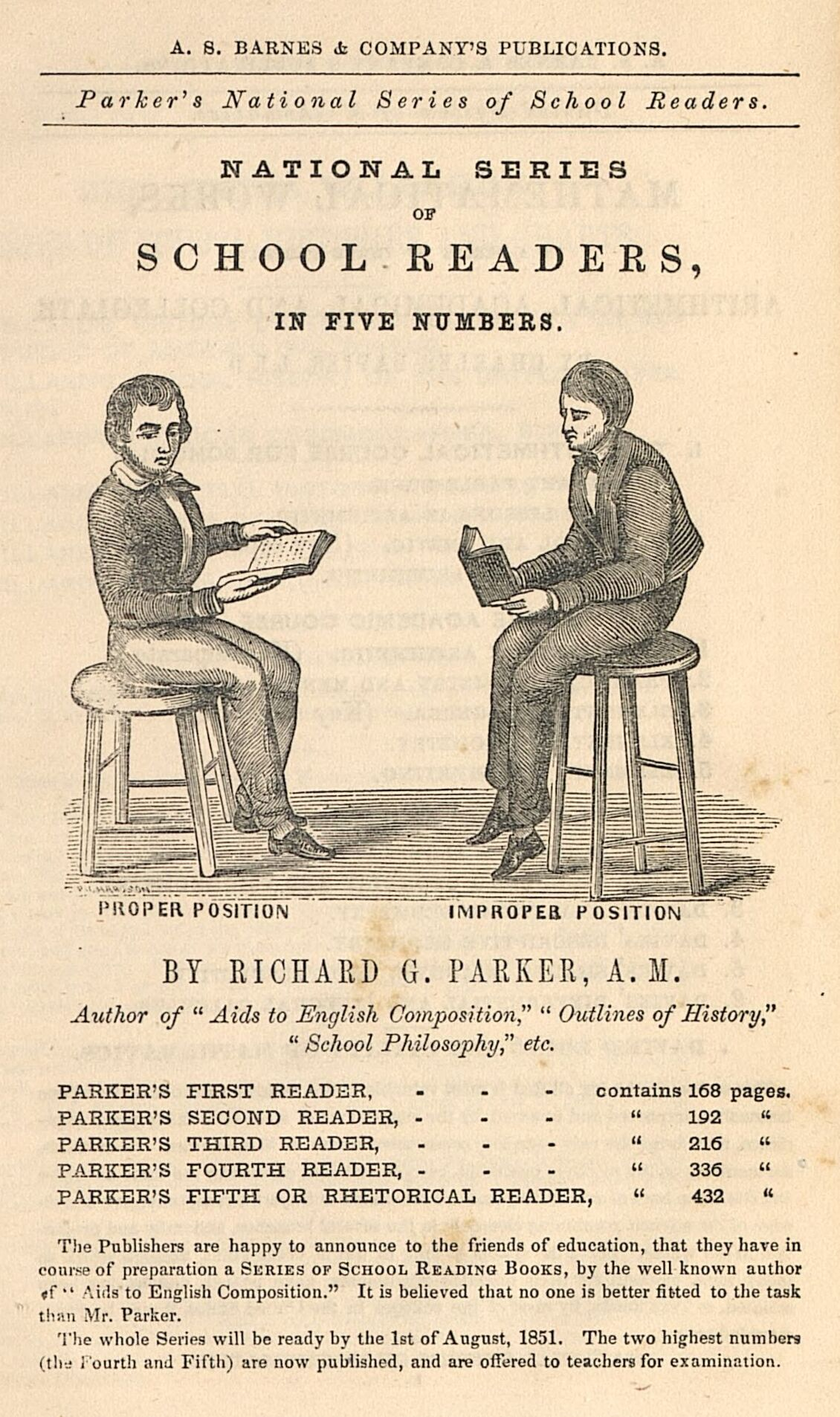
  National Series of School Readers in Five Numbers, from Minnesota Year Book for 1851.

=== Histories ===
- History of the Grammar School in East Parish, Roxbury (Boston, 1826)
- A Tribute to the Life and Character of Jonas Chickering (Boston, William P. Tewksbury, 1854)
