= School of Natural Philosophy =

Science textbook

School of Natural Philosophy is an 1837 scientific textbook by Richard Green Parker.

It is credited with inspiring the inventor Thomas Edison.
