= List of things named after Thomas Edison =

This is a list of things named after Thomas Edison.

== Places and people ==
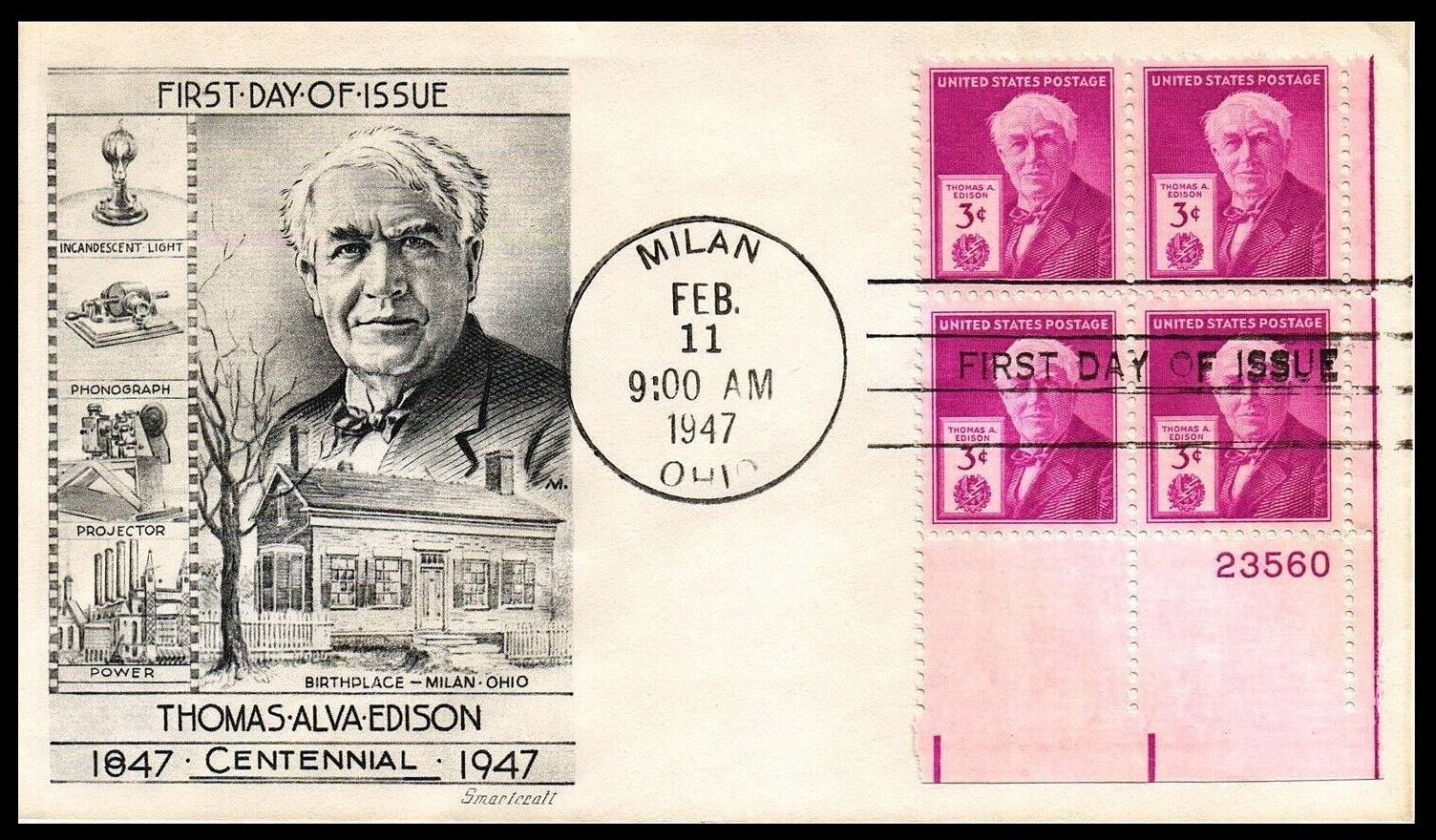
Thomas Edison commemorative stamp, first issued on the 100th anniversary of his birth in 1947

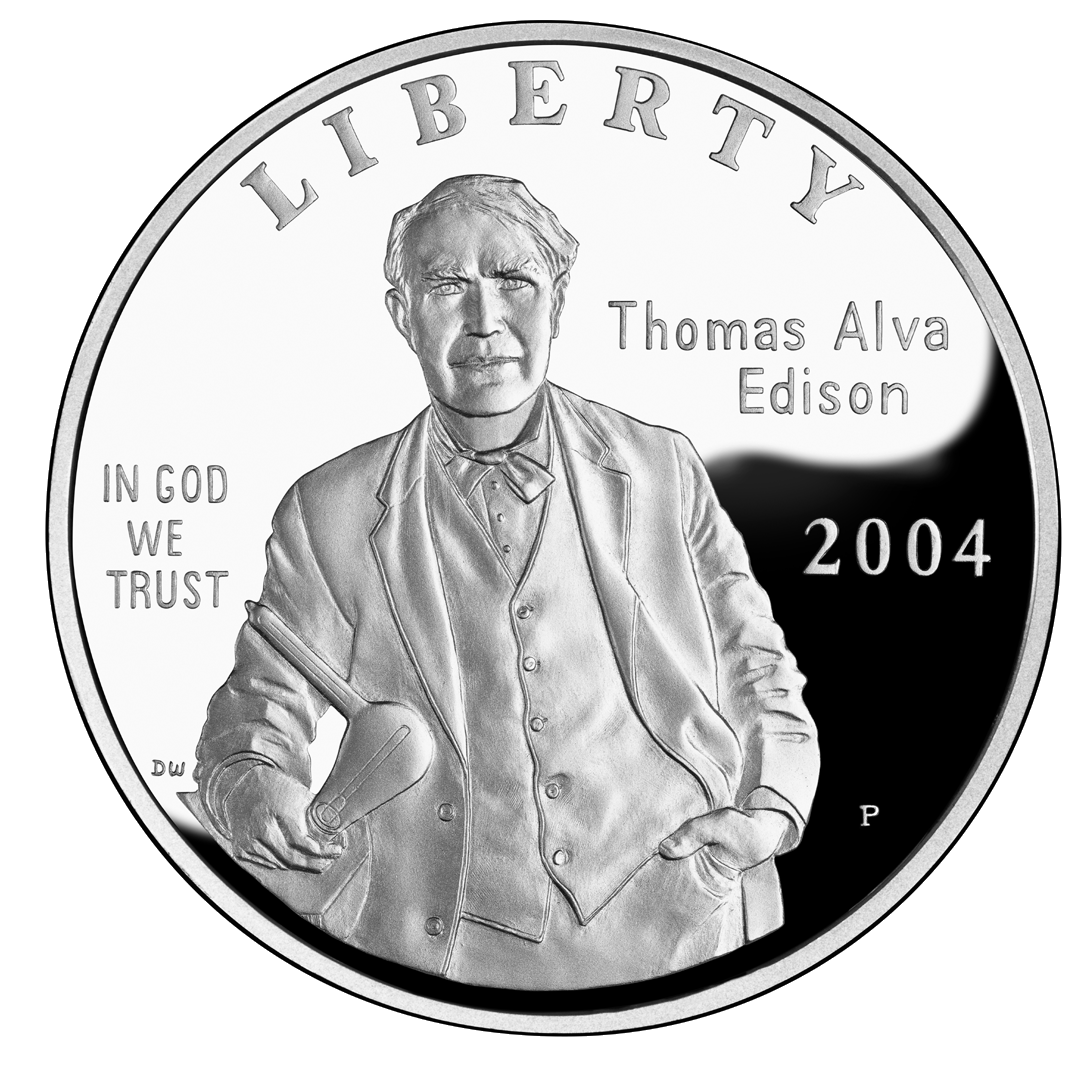
The 2004 Thomas Alva Edison silver dollar commemorated the 125th anniversary of the invention of the light bulb.

Several places have been named after Edison, most notably the town of Edison, New Jersey. Thomas Edison State University, nationally known for adult learners, is in Trenton, New Jersey. Two community colleges are named for him: Edison State College (now Florida SouthWestern State College) in Fort Myers, Florida, and Edison Community College in Piqua, Ohio. The Thomas A. Edison Science Hall at Monmouth University in West Long Branch, New Jersey is also named in his honor.

There are numerous high schools named after Edison (see Edison High School) and other schools including Thomas A. Edison Middle School. Footballer Pelé's father originally named him Edison, as a tribute to the inventor of the light bulb, but the name was incorrectly listed on his birth certificate as "Edson".

In 1883, the City Hotel in Sunbury, Pennsylvania was the first building to be lit with Edison's three-wire system. The hotel was renamed The Hotel Edison upon Edison's return to the city on 1922.

In 1954, Lake Thomas A Edison in California was named after Edison to mark the 75th anniversary of the incandescent light bulb.

Edison was on hand to turn on the lights at the Hotel Edison in New York City when it opened in 1931.

Three bridges around the United States have been named in Edison's honor: the Edison Bridge in New Jersey, the Edison Bridge in Florida, and the Edison Bridge in Ohio.

In space, his name is commemorated in asteroid 742 Edisona.

Mount Edison in the Chugach Mountains of Alaska was named after him in 1955.

== Museums and memorials ==
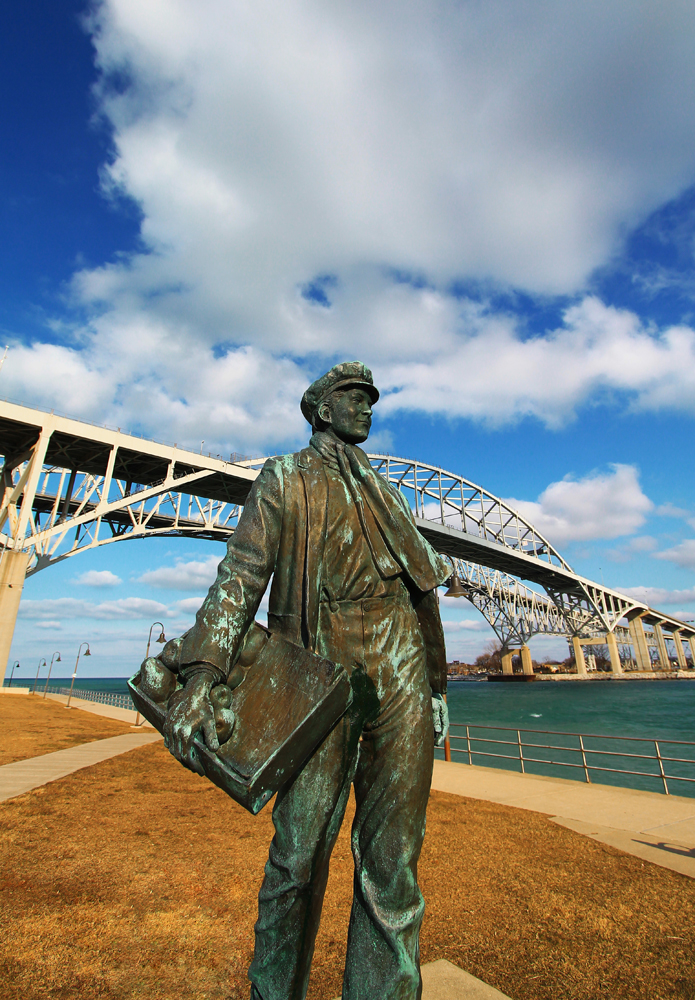
Statue of young Thomas Edison by the railroad tracks in Port Huron, Michigan. The Blue Water Bridge can be seen in the background.

In Milan, Ohio, the house Edison was born in has been converted into the Thomas Alva Edison Birthplace museum.

In West Orange, New Jersey, the 13.5 acres (5.5 hectares) Glenmont estate is maintained and operated by the National Park Service as the Edison National Historic Site, as is his nearby laboratory and workshops including the reconstructed "Black Maria"—the world's first movie studio.

The Thomas Alva Edison Memorial Tower and Museum is in the town of Edison, New Jersey.

In Beaumont, Texas, there is an Edison Museum, though Edison never visited there.

The Port Huron Museum, in Port Huron, Michigan, restored the original depot that Thomas Edison worked out of as a young news butcher. The depot has been named the Thomas Edison Depot Museum. The town has many Edison historical landmarks, including the graves of Edison's parents, and a monument along the St. Clair River.

In Detroit, the Edison Memorial Fountain in Grand Circus Park was created to honor his achievements. The limestone fountain was dedicated October 21, 1929, the fiftieth anniversary of the creation of the light bulb. On the same night, The Edison Institute was dedicated in nearby Dearborn.

He was inducted into the Automotive Hall of Fame in 1969.

A bronze statue of Edison was placed in the National Statuary Hall Collection at the United States Capitol in 2016, with the formal dedication ceremony held on September 20 of that year. The Edison statue replaced one of 19th-century state governor William Allen that had been one of Ohio's two allowed contributions to the collection.

== Companies ==
- Edison General Electric, merged with Thomson-Houston Electric Company to form General Electric
- Commonwealth Edison, now part of Exelon
- Consolidated Edison
- Edison International
- Detroit Edison, a unit of DTE Energy
- Edison S.p.A., a unit of Italenergia
- Trade association the Edison Electric Institute, a lobbying and research group for investor-owned utilities in the United States
- Edison Ore-Milling Company
- Edison Portland Cement Company
- Ohio Edison (merged with Centerior in 1997 to form First Energy)
- Southern California Edison
- McGraw-Edison, an American manufacturer of electrical equipment, formed by the merger of McGraw Electric and Thomas A. Edison, Inc.

== Awards ==
The Edison Medal was created on February 11, 1904, by a group of Edison's friends and associates. Four years later the American Institute of Electrical Engineers (AIEE), later IEEE, entered into an agreement with the group to present the medal as its highest award. The first medal was presented in 1909 to Elihu Thomson. It is the oldest award in the area of electrical and electronics engineering, and is presented annually "for a career of meritorious achievement in electrical science, electrical engineering or the electrical arts".

In the Netherlands, the major music awards are named the Edison Award after him. The award is an annual Dutch music prize, awarded for outstanding achievements in the music industry, and is one of the oldest music awards in the world, having been presented since 1960.

Since 1997, the American Society of Mechanical Engineers has awarded the Thomas A. Edison Patent Award to individual patents that demonstrate a significant impact on the practice of mechanical engineering.

== Other items ==
The United States Navy named the USS Edison (DD-439), a Gleaves class destroyer, in his honor in 1940. The ship was decommissioned a few months after the end of World War II. In 1962, the Navy commissioned USS Thomas A. Edison (SSBN-610), a fleet ballistic missile nuclear-powered submarine, which was decommissioned in 1983.
