= Paul Israel (historian) =

American historian (born 1953)

Paul B. Israel (born 1953) is an American historian who is a specialist in the history of American invention and innovation. He is the director and general editor of the Thomas A. Edison Papers at Rutgers University.

== Books ==
Israel's books include:

- From Machine Shop to Industrial Laboratory: Telegraphy and the Changing Context of American Invention, 1830–1920 (Johns Hopkins University Press, 1992)
- Edison: A Life of Invention (Wiley, 1998)
- Edison's Electric Light: The Art of Invention (with Robert Friedel, Johns Hopkins University Press, 2010)

He is the co-editor, variously with Thomas E. Jeffrey, Robert A. Rosenberg, Keith A. Nier, Louis Carlat, and Martha J. King, of:

- Thomas A. Edison Papers, A Selective Microfilm Edition: Part 1 (1850–1878) (University Publications of America, 1984)
- The Papers of Thomas A. Edison, Vol. 2: From Workshop to Laboratory, June 1873–March 1876 (Johns Hopkins University Press, 1991)
- The Papers of Thomas A. Edison, Vol. 3: Menlo Park: The Early Years, April 1876–December 1877 (Johns Hopkins University Press, 1994)
- The Papers of Thomas A. Edison, Vol. 4: The Wizard of Menlo Park, 1878 (Johns Hopkins University Press, 1999)
- The Papers of Thomas A. Edison, Vol. 5: Research to Development at Menlo Park, January 1879–March 1881 (Johns Hopkins University Press, 2004)
- The Papers of Thomas A. Edison, Vol. 6: Electrifying New York and Abroad, April 1881–March 1883 (Johns Hopkins University Press, 2007)
- The Papers of Thomas A. Edison, Vol. 7: Losses and Loyalties, April 1883–December 1884 (Johns Hopkins University Press, 2011)
