= Paul Israel (rugby league) =

Australian rugby league footballer

Personal information
- Full name: Paul Israel
- Born: 7 April 1972 (age 54) Sydney, New South Wales, Australia

Playing information
- Height: 182 cm (6 ft 0 in)
- Weight: 81 kg (12 st 11 lb; 179 lb)
- Position: Lock
Club
Years	Team	Pld	T	G	FG	P
1993	South Sydney Rabbitohs	3	0	0	0	0

Paul Israel (born 7 April 1972) is an Australian former rugby league footballer who played for the South Sydney Rabbitohs in the New South Wales Rugby League competition in Australia, his position of choice was as a Lock-forward.

== Background ==
Israel was born in Sydney, New South Wales, Australia.

== Career playing statistics ==
=== Point scoring summary ===
Games	Tries	Goals	F/G	Points
3	0	0	0	0

=== Matches played ===
Team	Matches	Years
South Sydney Rabbitohs	3	1993
