= National Register of Historic Places listings in North and Northwest Baltimore =

National Register of Historic Places listings in the north and northwestern parts of the city of Baltimore, Maryland

The locations of the National Register properties and districts listed below (at least for all showing latitude and longitude coordinates below) may be seen in a map by clicking on "Map of all coordinates".

This list covers some of the properties in the independent city of Baltimore, but not those in the county of Baltimore surrounding the city. The county actually does not include the city; the city is an independent county equivalent.

This National Park Service list is complete through NPS recent listings posted April 10, 2026.

== Current listings ==
	Name on the Register	Image	Date listed	Location	District	Description
1	Louisa May Alcott School	Louisa May Alcott School	March 29, 1990 (#90000544)	2702 Keyworth Ave. 39°19′58″N 76°39′49″W	Northwest	
2	Ambassador Theater	Ambassador Theater	February 27, 2023 (#100008654)	4604 Liberty Heights Ave. 39°19′52″N 76°41′42″W	Northwest	
3	American Ice Company Baltimore Plant No. 2	American Ice Company Baltimore Plant No. 2	December 27, 2002 (#02001589)	330 W. 23rd St. 39°18′55″N 76°37′19″W	North	
4	Arch Social Club	Arch Social Club	February 6, 2025 (#100011434)	2426 Pennsylvania Avenue; 39°18′36″N 76°38′33″W		
5	Auchentoroly Terrace Historic District	Auchentoroly Terrace Historic District	September 17, 2015 (#15000604)	Roughly bounded by Auchentoroly Terrace, Reisterstown Rd., Liberty Heights & Fulton Aves. 39°19′03″N 76°38′57″W	Northwest	
6	Bellona-Gittings Historic District	Bellona-Gittings Historic District	December 24, 2008 (#08001217)	Bounded by E. Lake, Melrose, and Gittings Aves. and York, Charles, Charlesbrooke, and Overbrook Rds. 39°22′09″N 76°37′21″W	North	
7	Brick Hill	Brick Hill	July 1, 1988 (#88000743)	Seneca St., Oakington St., and Parkden Ave. 39°19′49″N 76°38′38″W	North	
8	Cedar Grove	Cedar Grove	November 15, 1996 (#96001349)	301 Kendall Rd. 39°20′43″N 76°37′46″W	North	
9	Cedarcroft Historic District	Cedarcroft Historic District	December 24, 2003 (#03001332)	Bounded by Gittings Ave., York Rd., E. Lake Ave., and Bellona Ave. 39°22′17″N 76°36′52″W	North	
10	Charlcote House	Charlcote House	October 17, 1988 (#88001858)	15 Charlcote Pl. 39°20′37″N 76°37′08″W	North	
11	Charles Village-Abell Historic District	Charles Village-Abell Historic District	December 15, 1983 (#83003629)	Roughly bounded by University Parkway, Guilford Ave., and 25th, Mace, Charles, and Barclay Sts. 39°19′27″N 76°36′55″W	North	See also Charles Village and Abell
12	Cylburn House and Park District	Cylburn House and Park District	May 4, 1972 (#72001493)	4915 Green Spring Ave. 39°21′09″N 76°39′10″W	North	
13	Dickeyville Historic District	Dickeyville Historic District	July 12, 1972 (#72001494)	Both sides of Forest Park Ave. in Gwynn's Falls area 39°19′00″N 76°42′18″W	Northwest	
14	Druid Hill Park Historic District	Druid Hill Park Historic District	May 22, 1973 (#73002183)	Druid Hill Park; 39°19′23″N 76°38′41″W	North	
15	Eastern High School	Eastern High School	August 16, 2000 (#00000870)	1101 E. 33rd St. 39°19′40″N 76°36′08″W	North	
16	Ednor Gardens Historic District	Ednor Gardens Historic District	March 30, 2004 (#03001373)	Roughly bounded by Ellerslie Ave., 36th St., The Alameda, Andover Rd. and Chestnut Hill Ave. 39°20′09″N 76°36′01″W	North	
17	Evergreen House	Evergreen House	January 17, 1983 (#83002932)	4545 N. Charles St. 39°20′54″N 76°37′16″W	North	
18	Evergreen on the Falls	Evergreen on the Falls	July 30, 1975 (#75002095)	3300 Falls Rd. 39°19′37″N 76°38′06″W	North	
19	First Church of Christ, Scientist	First Church of Christ, Scientist	December 27, 1982 (#82001584)	102 W. University Parkway; 39°20′06″N 76°37′16″W	North	
20	Gallagher Mansion and Outbuilding	Gallagher Mansion and Outbuilding	September 15, 1983 (#83002934)	431-435 Notre Dame Lane; 39°21′05″N 76°36′39″W	North	
21	Grace-Hampden Methodist Episcopal Church	Grace-Hampden Methodist Episcopal Church	August 2, 2001 (#01000809)	1014 W. 36th St. 39°19′52″N 76°38′01″W	North	
22	Greater Homeland Historic District	Greater Homeland Historic District	December 28, 2001 (#01001377)	Roughly bounded by Charles St. Homeland Ave., York Rd., and Melrose Ave. 39°21′34″N 76°37′08″W	North	
23	Guilford Historic District	Guilford Historic District	July 19, 2001 (#01000745)	Roughly bounded by N. Charles St., Warrenton Rd., Linkwood Rd., Cold Spring Ln., York Rd., Southway, University Parkway, and Bishops Rd. 39°20′31″N 76°37′00″W	North	
24	Hampden Historic District	Hampden Historic District	December 29, 2004 (#04001405)	Roughly bounded by Jones Falls, W. 40th St. and Wyman Park; 39°19′57″N 76°37′57″W	North	
25	Highfield House	Highfield House	September 12, 2007 (#07000942)	4000 N. Charles St. 39°20′18″N 76°37′08″W	North	
26	Hochschild, Kohn Belvedere and Hess Shoes	Hochschild, Kohn Belvedere and Hess Shoes	December 18, 2003 (#03001296)	5911 York Rd. and 510 Belvedere Ave. 39°21′57″N 76°36′35″W	North	
27	Homewood	Homewood	September 10, 1971 (#71001033)	N. Charles and 34th Sts. 39°19′46″N 76°37′09″W	North	
28	James E. Hooper House	James E. Hooper House	March 15, 1982 (#82004746)	100 E. 23rd St. 39°18′56″N 76°36′56″W	North	
29	Howard Park P.S. 218	Howard Park P.S. 218	September 27, 2000 (#00001084)	4801 Liberty Heights Ave. 39°19′53″N 76°41′54″W	Northwest	
30	Lake Drive Apartments	Lake Drive Apartments	December 28, 2001 (#01001368)	903 Druid Park Lake Dr. 39°19′00″N 76°38′13″W	North	
31	Lake-Evesham Historic District	Lake-Evesham Historic District	December 23, 2003 (#03001323)	Roughly bounded by East Lake Ave., York Rd., Evesham Ave., and Bellona Ave. 39°22′06″N 76°36′49″W	North	
32	Lake Roland Historic District	Lake Roland Historic District	October 15, 1992 (#92001285)	Robert E. Lee Memorial Park; 39°23′13″N 76°38′49″W	North	
33	Lombard Street Bridge		September 27, 1972 (#75002093)	Over Gwynns Falls off Wetheredsville Rd. 39°19′00″N 76°42′01″W	Northwest	dismantled and placed into storage in 1975.
34	Londontown Manufacturing Company, Inc.	Londontown Manufacturing Company, Inc.	January 12, 1973 (#73002188)	3600 Clipper Mill Rd. 39°19′53″N 76°38′34″W	North	
35	Lovely Lane Methodist Church	Lovely Lane Methodist Church	May 25, 1973 (#73002189)	2200 St. Paul St. 39°18′52″N 76°36′57″W	North	
36	Maryland and Pennsylvania Railroad Falls Road Roundhouse		February 5, 2026 (#100012695)	2201 and 2601 Falls Road; 39°19′00″N 76°37′33″W		
37	The Maryland Club	The Maryland Club	January 29, 2024 (#100009814)	1 East Eager St. 39°18′04″N 76°36′56″W		
38	Elmer V. McCollum House	Elmer V. McCollum House	January 7, 1976 (#76002182)	2301 Monticello Rd. 39°18′49″N 76°41′06″W	Northwest	
39	Midtown Edmondson Historic District	Midtown Edmondson Historic District	February 20, 2025 (#100011452)	Multiple; 39°17′46″N 76°39′01″W		
40	H.F. Miller & Son Tin Box and Can Manufacturing Plant	H.F. Miller & Son Tin Box and Can Manufacturing Plant	December 10, 2003 (#03001268)	2601 N. Howard St. 39°19′10″N 76°37′12″W	North	
41	Mount Vernon Mill No. 1	Mount Vernon Mill No. 1	April 19, 2001 (#01000388)	3000 Falls Rd. 39°19′23″N 76°37′52″W	North	
42	Mount Washington Mill Historic District	Mount Washington Mill Historic District	May 4, 1990 (#90000727)	1405-1407 Forge Ave.; also 1330-1340 Smith Ave. 39°22′05″N 76°39′01″W	North	Smith Ave. addresses represent a boundary increase.
43	Northern District Police Station	Northern District Police Station	December 28, 2001 (#01001372)	3355 Keswick Rd. 39°19′42″N 76°37′39″W	North	
44	Northwood Historic District	Northwood Historic District	June 15, 1998 (#98000596)	Loch Raven Boulevard, The Almeda, and Cold Spring Ln. 39°20′26″N 76°35′48″W	North	
45	Oakenshawe Historic District	Oakenshawe Historic District	December 18, 2003 (#03001293)	Roughly bounded by York Rd., University Parkway, Calvert St., and Southway; 39°19′55″N 76°36′48″W	North	
46	Old Goucher College Buildings	Old Goucher College Buildings	August 25, 1978 (#78003143)	Roughly bounded by 24th, N. Calvert, and 23rd Sts., and Maryland Ave. 39°18′57″N 76°37′02″W	North	
47	Park Circle Historic District	Park Circle Historic District	December 4, 2008 (#08001124)	Roughly bounded by Overview Ave., Shirley Ave., Cottage Ave., and Henry G. Parks Jr. Circle; 39°19′40″N 76°39′36″W	Northwest	
48	Park Heights Historic District	Park Heights Historic District	August 31, 2023 (#100009276)	Roughly bounded by Northern Pkwy., Greenspring Ave., the Park Circle Historic District, and the Western MD rail line. 39°20′46″N 76°40′20″W	Northwest	
49	Poole and Hunt Company Buildings	Poole and Hunt Company Buildings	July 2, 1973 (#73002194)	3500 Clipper Rd. 39°19′53″N 76°38′45″W	North	
50	Radnor-Winston Historic District	Radnor-Winston Historic District	December 29, 2003 (#03001327)	Roughly bounded by Notre Dame Ln., College of Notre Dame, Radnor Ave. and York Rd. 39°21′04″N 76°36′45″W	North	
51	Remington Historic District	Remington Historic District	January 17, 2017 (#100000530)	Roughly bounded by W. 22nd & Sisson Sts., Wyman Park Dr., Mace Alley; 39°19′15″N 76°37′20″W	North	
52	Riviera Apartments	Riviera Apartments	August 12, 1999 (#99000985)	901 Druid Park Lake Dr. 39°19′07″N 76°38′11″W	North	
53	Roland Park Historic District	Roland Park Historic District	December 23, 1974 (#74002213)	Irregular pattern between Belvedere Ave., Falls Rd., 39th St., and Stoney Run; 39°20′57″N 76°38′05″W	North	
54	Ruscombe	Ruscombe	December 20, 2007 (#07001033)	4901 Springarden Dr. 39°20′59″N 76°39′30″W	North	
55	St. John's Protestant Episcopal Church	St. John's Protestant Episcopal Church	March 27, 1974 (#74002214)	3009 Greenmount Ave. 39°19′31″N 76°36′32″W	North	
56	Samester Parkway Apartments	Samester Parkway Apartments	September 9, 1998 (#98001157)	7000-7022 Park Heights Ave. 39°21′58″N 76°42′23″W	Northwest	
57	Senator Theatre	Senator Theatre	August 24, 1989 (#89001153)	5904-5906 York Rd. 39°21′49″N 76°36′39″W	North	
58	Stieff Silver Company Factory	Stieff Silver Company Factory	June 30, 2000 (#00000744)	800 Wyman Park Dr. 39°19′08″N 76°37′42″W	North	
59	Stone Hill Historic District	Stone Hill Historic District	December 26, 2001 (#01001370)	Pacific, Puritan, Bay, Field, and Worth Sts. 39°19′24″N 76°37′46″W	North	
60	Tivoli	Tivoli	October 9, 1980 (#80001791)	1301 Woodbourne Ave. 39°21′12″N 76°35′33″W	North	
61	Tuscany-Canterbury Historic District	Tuscany-Canterbury Historic District	October 28, 2001 (#01001182)	Roughly bounded by Charles St., University Parkway, Stony Run, and Warrenton Rd. 39°20′16″N 76°37′18″W	North	
62	Upland		January 29, 2024 (#100009813)	1022 St. George's Road; 39°21′53″N 76°38′36″W		
63	Waverly Main Street Historic District	Waverly Main Street Historic District	December 31, 2013 (#13001020)	Roughly bounded by E. 29th & E. 35th Sts., Old York Rd., Greenmount Ave. 39°19′42″N 76°36′32″W	Northwest	
64	Woodberry Historic District	Woodberry Historic District	December 29, 2003 (#03001326)	Roughly Clipper Ave, Druid Park Dr., and Girard, Hooper, Keystone, Malden, Parkdale, and Rockrose Aves. 39°20′05″N 76°38′52″W	North	

== See also ==
- National Register of Historic Places listings in Maryland
