= America's Castles =

- Genre: Video
- Narrated by: Joe van Riper
- Country of origin: United States
- Original language: English
- No. of seasons: 9
- No. of episodes: 25+

Production
- Executive producer: Scott Galloway
- Production locations: Conrad Mansion (Kalispell, Montana)
- Running time: 45 minutes
- Production company: Cinetel Productions

Original release
- Network: A&E Network
- Release: January 9, 1994 – July 15, 2005

America's Castles is a documentary television series that aired on A&E Network from 1994 to 2005. Through interviews, historic photos and newly shot footage, the program documents the mansions and summer homes of the high society of The Gilded Age. The series is narrated by Joe van Riper and many episodes feature architectural expert Richard Guy Wilson.

== Featured homes ==
- Agecroft Hall
- Belcourt Castle
- Biltmore Estate
- Bishop's Palace (Galveston, Texas)
- The Breakers
- Cà d'Zan
- Camp Pine Knot
- Camp Uncas
- Castillo Serralles (in 1996)
- Casa Loma
- Chapultepec Castle
- Château-sur-Mer
- Conrad Mansion Museum
- Eagle's Nest
- The Elms
- Evergreen House
- Fair Lane
- Filoli
- Fonthill Castle
- Frank Lloyd Wright Home and Studio
- Glensheen Mansion
- Great Camp Sagamore
- Hearst Castle
- Hempstead House/Falaise
- Hillwood Estate, Museum & Gardens
- Kykuit
- Longwood
- Longue Vue House and Gardens
- Lyndhurst
- Mar-a-Lago
- Marble House
- Meadow Brook Hall
- Nottoway Plantation
- Oak Alley Plantation/Bon Sejour
- Old Westbury Gardens
- Parkwood Estate (Samuel McLaughlin home, Oshawa)
- Ralston Hall
- Rosalie Plantation
- Rosecliff
- Rosemount Museum
- Sagamore Hill
- Salisbury House
- Scotty's Castle
- Shelburne Farms
- Springwood Estate
- Stan Hywet Hall
- Stanton Hall
- Taliesin
- Taliesin West
- Vanderbilt Mansion
- Villa Vizcaya
- Virginia House
- Whitehall
- The Winchester Mystery House
