= Miller's Court =

Miller's Court may refer to the following:

- Miller's Court, a street off of Dorset Street, in London associated with Jack the Ripper
- Miller's Court, or H.F. Miller & Son Tin Box and Can Manufacturing Plant, a historic can manufacturing plant located at Baltimore, Maryland, United States
- Miller's Court, a locally produced television program hosted by law professor Arthur R. Miller, running from the late 1970s until the early 1990s
