= Homewood Museum =

Museum in Baltimore, Maryland, United States

- Homewood
- U.S. National Register of Historic Places
- U.S. National Historic Landmark
- Baltimore City Landmark
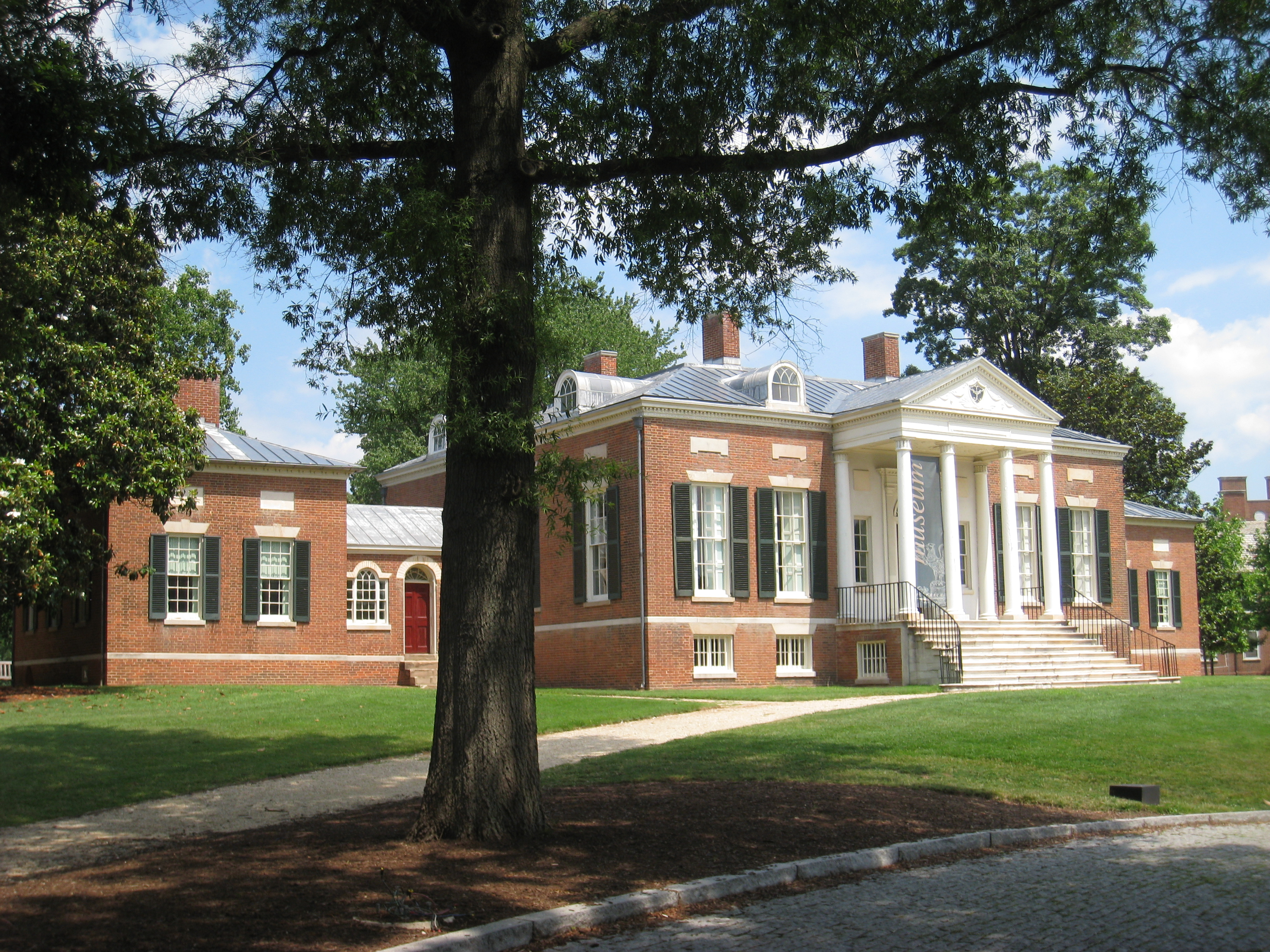
- Interactive map of Homewood
- Location: 3400 N. Charles St. Baltimore, Maryland
- Coordinates: 39°19′46″N 76°37′9″W
- Built: 1801
- Architectural style: Federal
- NRHP reference No.: 71001033

Significant dates
- Added to NRHP: September 10, 1971
- Designated NHL: November 11, 1971
- Designated BCL: 1975

The Homewood Museum is a historical museum located on the Johns Hopkins University campus in Baltimore, Maryland. It was listed as a National Historic Landmark in 1971, noted as a family home of Maryland's Carroll family. It, along with Evergreen Museum & Library, make up the Johns Hopkins University Museums.

== History ==
The Homewood Estate was offered as a wedding gift in 1800 by Charles Carroll of Carrollton, (1737–1832), the longest surviving signer of the Declaration of Independence, to his son Charles Carroll Jr. It occupied 140 acres (57 ha) acres in northern Baltimore and was first known as "Merryman's Lott." Carroll had purchased the parcel of land in 1794. Charles Carroll Jr. began construction on a stately and modern country home of his own design in 1801 and had mostly finished by 1808. It cost $40,000, four times the budgeted expense. For reasons both personal and political, "Homewood" led to a severe breach in relations between father and son. Ultimately, Carroll (Senior) bought the house from his son in 1824 and managed the "most improvident waste" until his son's death the next year. The house then passed to Charles Carroll III, (the grandson), who lived there until he inherited the rural landmark family estate, Doughoregan Manor (in modern Howard County), from his grandfather.

The house was the birthplace of John Lee Carroll in 1830, second son of Charles Carroll, III, who would become Governor of Maryland. In 1839, Charles Carroll III sold Homewood to Samuel Wyman, a Baltimore merchant, who lived there with his family until 1865. During the Wyman family's tenure, Wyman's son William commissioned Richard Upjohn to build an Italianate mansion on the grounds, named "Homewood Villa." The Villa was demolished by Johns Hopkins University in 1954; however, the gatehouse to the estate remains, and can be seen as an example of the villa design. On Samuel Wyman's death the property was divided between his sons. In 1897, Homewood House became the first Gilman School, known at its founding as The Country School for Boys. In 1902 the property was reassembled and given to Johns Hopkins University.

In 1916 the mansion became the University Faculty Club. In 1936, Homewood was converted to offices for the university president and deans. Johns Hopkins University now operates Homewood Museum, which opened to the public in 1987, and its Federal-style architecture, with its red brick and white marble, serves as the inspiration for the campus' design.

== Architecture ==
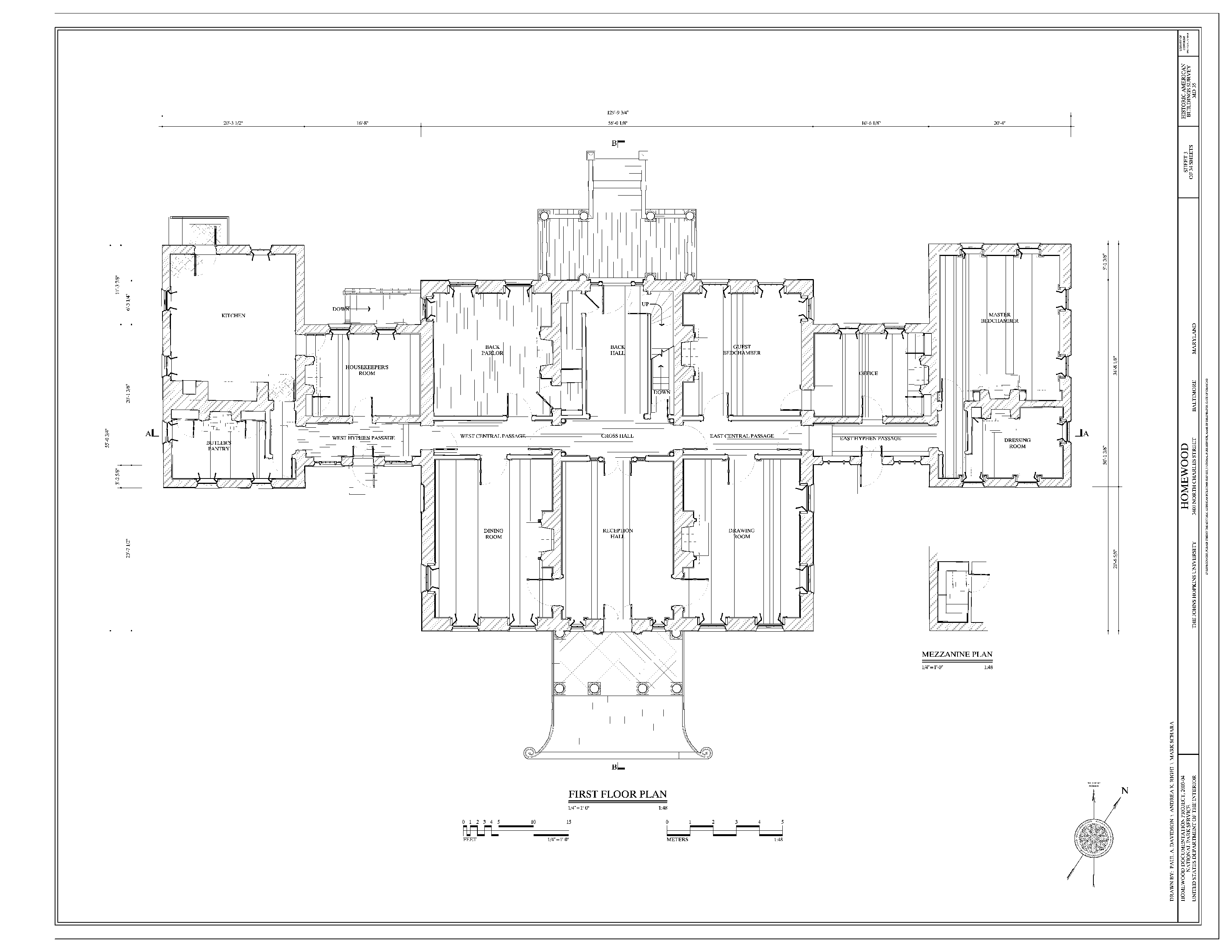
First floor plan

Homewood exhibits a Palladian-inspired five-part plan, that reflects harmony in the proportions and sophisticated details in its construction. The five-part plan is based on a central block comprising the main residence, with flanking pavilions or dependencies linked to the center by hyphens. The house, while planned and massed in the Georgian style, uses Federal-style detailing, reflecting influences of the English architecture of Robert Adam. While Georgian architecture has significant surface relief, the Federal style is flatter, with smaller-scale details, as seen at Homewood. The four-columned portico dominates the main elevation.

The 1½ story central block was the center for formal entertainment, with a reception room, dining room and drawing room on the south side. The west wing was devoted to services, such as kitchens, while the east wing was for family use, on a more intimate basis than the main house. Unlike many five-part houses in the area, the central block did not have a full second floor, causing bedrooms and family areas to move into the wings.

Homewood is furnished today as it would have been in the 19th century. It is home to the Homewood Museum, which features period furnishings that complement its architecture.

== See also ==
- Homewood Field
- Carroll family
- List of National Historic Landmarks in Maryland
- National Register of Historic Places listings in North and Northwest Baltimore
