= Struever Bros., Eccles & Rouse =

Struever Bros Eccles and Rouse stylized "Struever Bros., Eccles & Rouse" or "SBER" (1974-2009) was a Baltimore, Maryland property developer responsible for many high-profile renovations of historic properties in and around Baltimore. SBER was a leader in using property tax credits for historic preservation. The company was founded and headed by Bill Struever, with his brother Fred, his college roommate Cobber Eccles, and Ted Rouse, the son of famed developer James Rouse. The company went bankrupt in 2009 due to the economic downturn. It later re-emerged with many of the same staff as Cross Street Partners.

Projects SBER completed in Baltimore include: Brown's Arcade; the old Louie's Bookstore & Cafe, and the Park Plaza on North Charles Street; Mill Centre and the Stieff Silver building near Hampden; Tindeco Wharf; Canton Cove and the American Can Company building in Canton; Tide Point in Locust Point; and the Wiessner-American Brewery building. he also redeveloped Clipper Mill, the former sail factory on the Jones Falls.

Beyond Baltimore, they did projects Wilmington, Delaware; Durham, North Carolina; and Providence, Rhode Island; and Boston and Fenway Park.
