= Hylehurst =

Historic house in North Carolina, United States

- U.S. National Register of Historic Places
- Location within North Carolina Location within the United States
- Location: 224 S. Cherry St., Winston-Salem, North Carolina
- Coordinates: 36°5′32″N 80°14′48″W
- Area: less than one acre
- Built: 1884
- Architect: Holly, Henry Hudson
- Architectural style: Queen Anne
- NRHP reference No.: 83001878
- Added to NRHP: July 21, 1983

Hylehurst, also known as the John W. Fries House, is a historic home located at Winston-Salem, Forsyth County, North Carolina, United States. It was designed by Henry Hudson Holly and built in 1884. The house is a three-story, Queen Anne style dwelling. It features projecting gable ends with timbering and scalloped shingles and a wraparound verandah. It was built for John W. Fries, a prominent Winston-Salem industrialist, whose father built the Arista Cotton Mill Complex.

The house was listed on the National Register of Historic Places in 1983.
