= Elmer V. McCollum House =

Historic house in Maryland, United States

- U.S. National Register of Historic Places
- U.S. National Historic Landmark
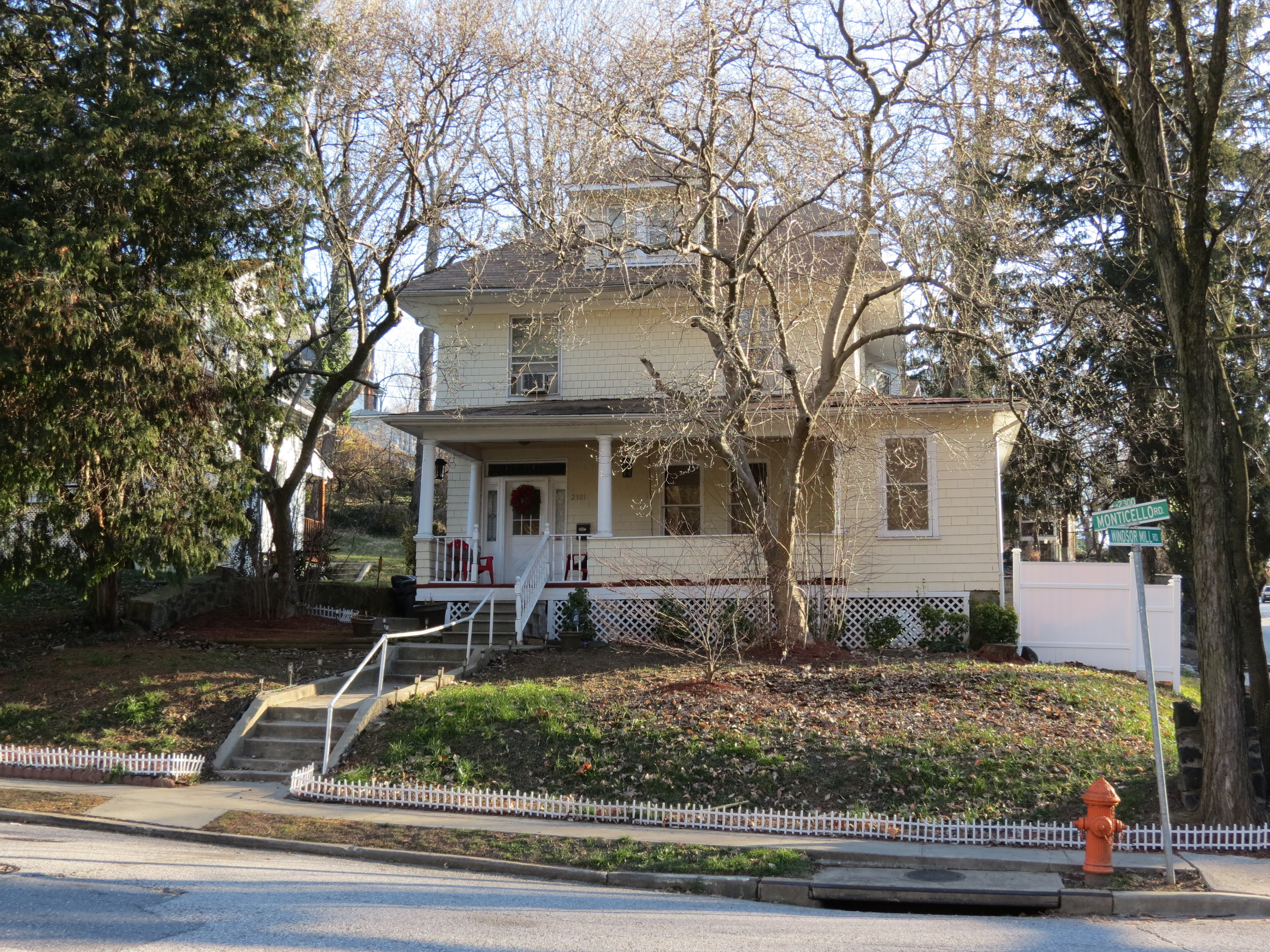

- Location within Baltimore Location within Maryland Location within the United States
- Location: 2301 Monticello Road, Baltimore, Maryland
- Coordinates: 39°18′49″N 76°41′6″W
- Built: c. 1920
- NRHP reference No.: 76002182

Significant dates
- Added to NRHP: January 7, 1976
- Designated NHL: January 7, 1976

The Elmer McCollum House is a historic house at 2301 Monticello Road in Baltimore, Maryland. Built about 1920, it is significant for its association with Johns Hopkins University researcher Elmer McCollum (1879-1967), who lived in the house from 1929 to 1939. During this period, McCollum conducted significant research into nutritional disease. The house was designated a National Historic Landmark in 1973.

== Description and significance ==
The Elmer McCollum House is located in the Forest Park region of northwestern Baltimore, at the northeast corner of Monticello Road with Windsor Hills Road. The house is believed to have been built around 1920, and has no intrinsic architectural value apart from its value as an exemplar of the vernacular of its time. It is a 2½ story structure with a dormered hip roof, a front porch supported by round columns, and entrance surround with sidelight windows. The interior has a side hall plan, and has been divided into three apartments. Elmer McCollum lived here for ten years, 1929–1939, longer than any other address in Baltimore.

McCollum, a native of Kansas, graduated from the University of Kansas in 1903, and earned a PhD in chemistry from Yale University in 1906. He began researching nutrition while teaching at the Wisconsin Agricultural Experimental Station, discovering Vitamin A in 1913. He was recruited to teach at Johns Hopkins University in 1917, where his continued research into vitamins led to the discovery of many of the B-complex vitamins, and greatly expanded knowledge of diet-deficiency diseases such as rickets and scurvy. The American Society of Clinical Nutrition established an award in his name in 1965.

== See also ==
- List of National Historic Landmarks in Maryland
- National Register of Historic Places listings in North and Northwest Baltimore
