= Henry F. Brauns =

American architect (1845-1917)

- Born: October 4, 1845
- Died: May 7, 1917 (aged 71); Betterton, Maryland, US
- Occupation: Architect
- Buildings: Brown's Arcade

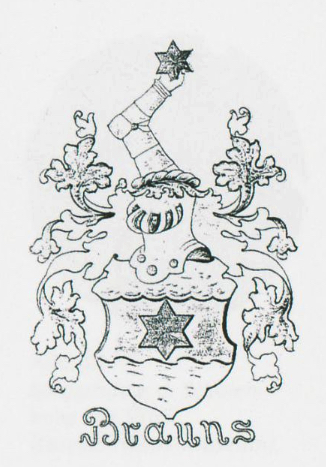
coat of arms Brauns, Hannover (Lower Saxony, Germany)

Henry F. Brauns (October 4, 1845 – May 7, 1917) was an architect based in Baltimore, Maryland, United States. He was a son of Ferdinand L. (consul general of the Kingdoms of Saxony, Württemberg, Bavaria and Prussia) and Henrietta Brauns (born Focke) and was one of ten brothers and sisters. His grandfather C.W. Brauns had fought during the Revolutionary War in a Hessian regiment. Among his brothers were Rev. F.W. Brauns a Presbyterian minister, Ferdinand L. Brauns an accountant of local repute. Brauns came from the German Brauns family from Lower Saxony (one of his ancestors, Johann Brauns, was a councilor of George I.) and was also a descendant of Benjamin Edes and Peter Tufts. He started his practice at the age of 18. He was a charter member of the Baltimore Chapter of the Archaeological Institute of America in December 1870.

Many of Brauns's known works were industrial buildings, most of which are now destroyed, and various buildings for Baltimore city's water and sewer works. Among these was the Mount Royal Pumping Station at the corner of North Avenue and McMechen Street in Baltimore, designs of which were completed in 1897. In keeping with the times, these structures were highly ornamental. In summer 1894, he completed design of the Pratt Street Power-House for the City and Suburban Railway Company in Baltimore. He also designed the Romanesque Revival tower and facade of Holy Cross Polish National Catholic Church in 1902.

Brauns interest and expertise in public work led him to champion "the latest and best methods of school building architecture", as paraphrased by the Baltimore Sun coverage of a symposium November 12, 1898, in Easton, Maryland, where he presented and participated.

He died in 1917 at the summer resort of Betterton, Maryland.

== Selected works ==
- 1884: Lorraine Park Cemetery Gate Lodge, Baltimore, listed on the National Register of Historic Places in 1985.
- 1899: Northern District Police Station, Baltimore, listed on the National Register of Historic Places in 2001.
- 1904: Brown's Arcade, Baltimore, listed on the National Register of Historic Places in 1983.
