= Henry Hudson Holly =

American architect

- Born: 1832; New York City, U.S.
- Died: 1892
- Occupation: Architect

Henry Hudson Holly (1832-1892) was an American architect who, in his generation, was one of the best-known architects with a practice spanning the entire United States. He is probably best remembered as the author of three architectural books. "Holly's country seats: containing lithographic designs for cottages, villas, mansions, etc., with their accompanying outbuildings; also, country churches, city buildings, railway stations, etc., etc" which was published in 1863 by D. Appleton and Co. of New York and is a pattern book of standard primarily Italianate residential designs. In 1871 he published "Church Architecture. Illustrated with Thirty-Five Lithographic Plates, from Original Designs". In 1878 he published "Modern Dwellings in Town and Country Adapted to American Wants and Climate, with a Treatise on Furniture and Decoration" by Harper and Brothers of New York. It served to introduce the domestic Queen Anne Revival style to America. Both the Country Seats and the Modern Dwellings books were subsequently combined and reprinted as "Holly's Country Seats and Modern Dwellings" in 1977 by the American Life Foundation Library of Victorian Culture. The Church Architecture book has also subsequently been reprinted by at least two modern publishers - Wentworth Press on August 25, 2016 and Forgotten Books on July 19, 2017.

In his designs he is best remembered for his use of the American Queen Anne Revival style of architecture, although his earlier work, as evidenced by his first book, was in the Italianate style. There are no known surviving buildings of his Italianate phase. In 1884, he designed the historic home Hylehurst. Holly designed Thomas Edison's Glenmont estate and, in 1887, Edison's West Orange laboratory. In the late 1880s he also designed a substantial mansion for the Thatcher family in Pueblo, Colorado which was demolished in the mid-twentieth century to be replaced by a hospital. However, in 1891, Mr. Thatcher's brother, John, commissioned Holly to design his own mansion and carriage house on a nearby block. The mansion was given the name, Rosemount, by the family and survives today as the Rosemount Museum.

In 1865-66 he designed the Noroton Presbyterian Church in Darien, Connecticut in the Gothic Revival style. This church is of technical interest in its very early employment of concrete blocks used as structural masonry. In 1878 he designed St. Luke's Hall for the University of the South in Sewanee, Tennessee. A surviving perspective by his hand depicts a competent Gothic Revival design after the English style of residential college. Both of these buildings survive to this day.
