= Lorraine Park Cemetery Gate Lodge =

Historic house in Baltimore County, Maryland, US

- U.S. National Register of Historic Places
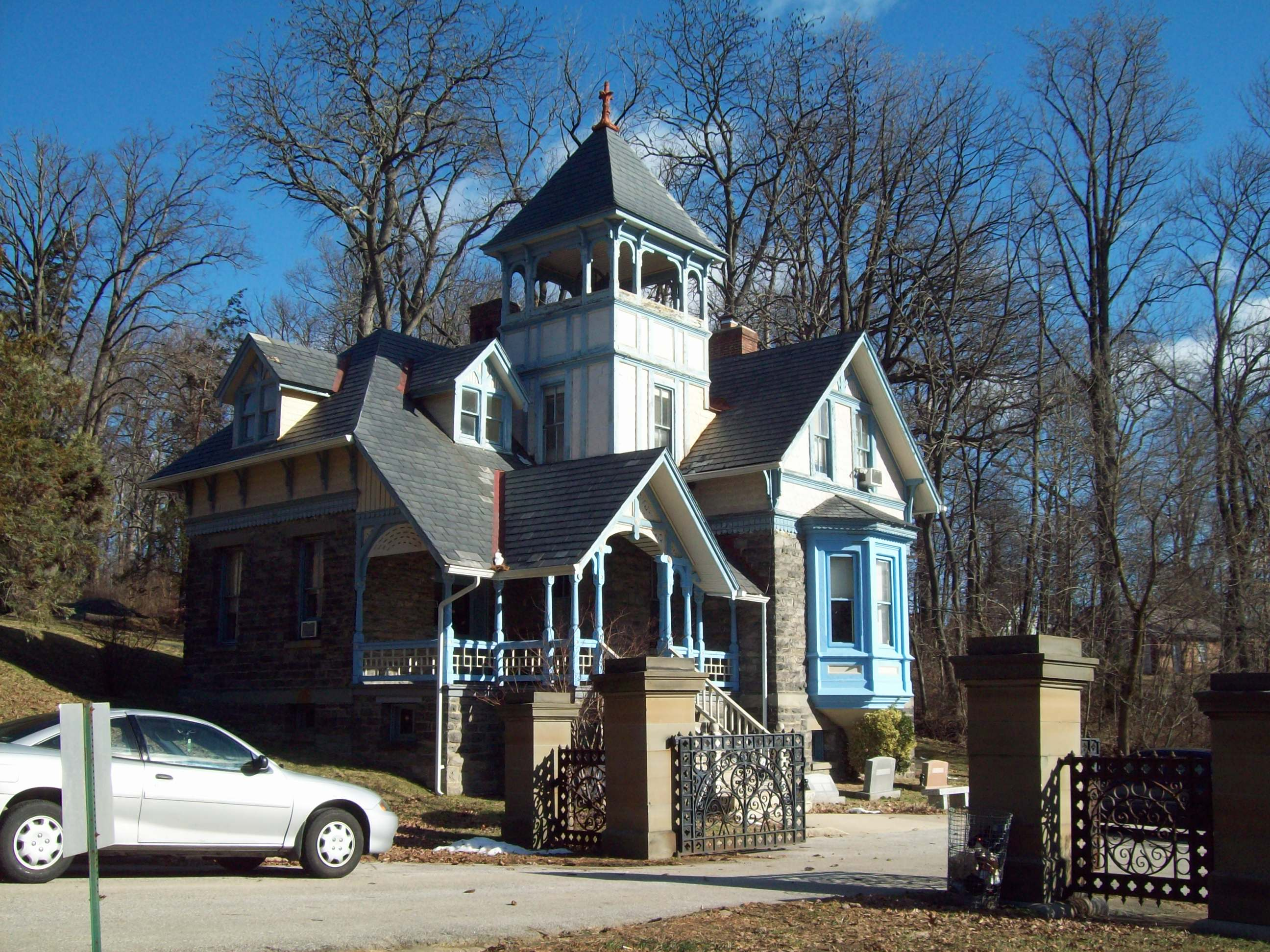
- Lorraine Park Cemetery Gate Lodge, December 2009

- Location within Maryland Location within the United States
- Nearest city: Woodlawn, Maryland
- Coordinates: 39°18′47″N 76°43′5″W
- Area: less than one acre
- Built: 1884
- Architect: Brauns, Henry
- Architectural style: Queen Anne
- NRHP reference No.: 85001613
- Added to NRHP: July 25, 1985

The Lorraine Park Cemetery Gate Lodge is a historic gatehouse located near Woodlawn, Baltimore County, Maryland, United States. It is a 1 1/2-story, Queen Anne–style stone-and-frame building designed by Baltimore architect Henry F. Brauns that was constructed in 1884. Adjacent to the house are the ornate cast-iron and wrought-iron Lorraine Cemetery gates.

The Lorraine Park Cemetery Gate Lodge was listed on the National Register of Historic Places in 1985.
