= Rosemount Museum =

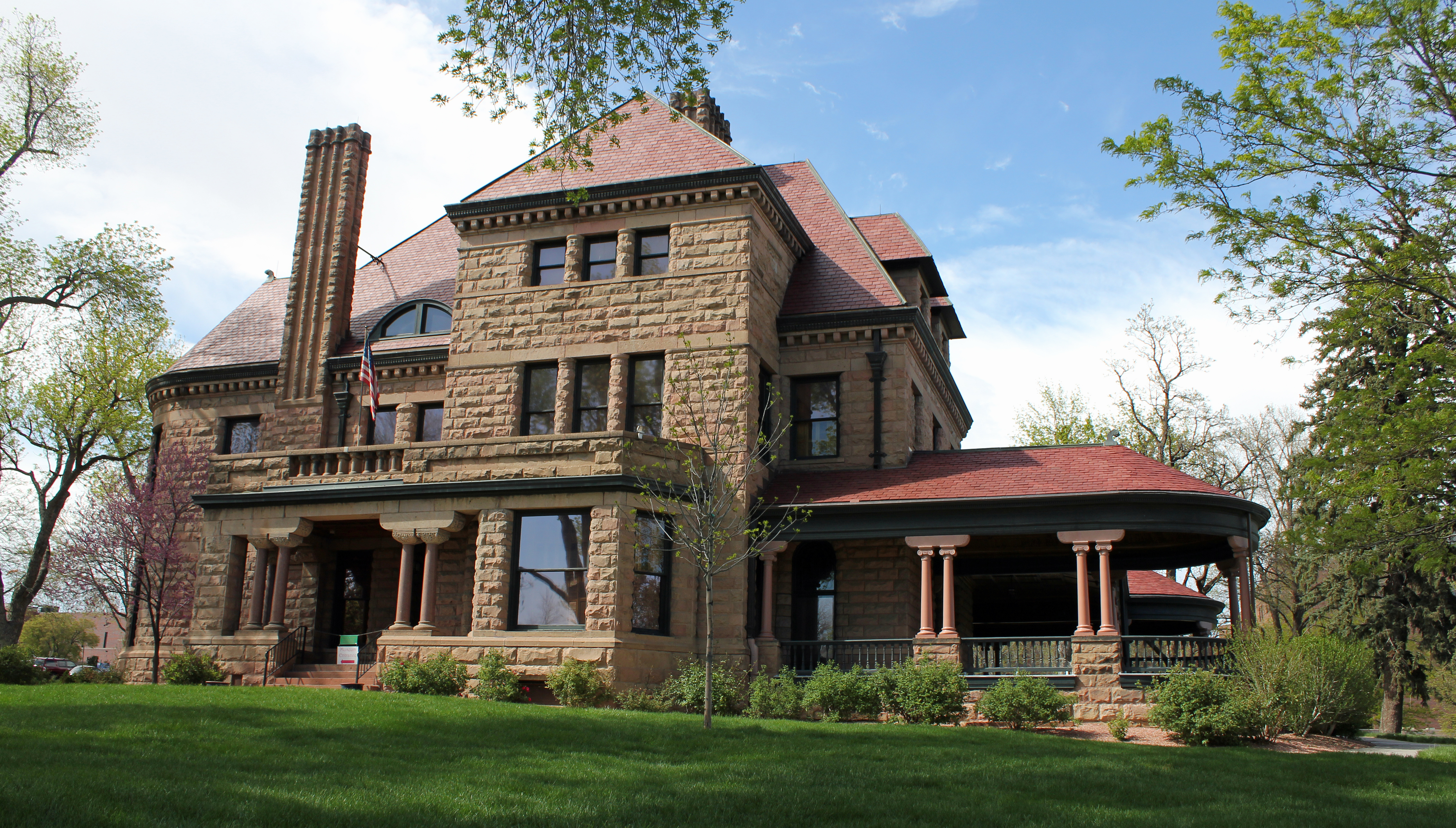
- Established: 1969
- Location: 419 West 14th Street; Pueblo, Colorado, US
- Coordinates: 38°16′50″N 104°36′43.5″W
- Type: Historic house museum
- Key holdings: Egyptian mummy
- Executive director: Deb Darrow
- Website: rosemount.org
- Rosemount
- U.S. National Register of Historic Places
- Location within Colorado
- Coordinates: 38°16′50″N 104°36′43.5″W
- Area: 5 acres (2.0 ha)
- Built: 1893
- Built by: McGonigle
- Architect: Henry Hudson Holly
- Architectural style: Late Victorian; Richardsonian Romanesque; Queen Anne
- NRHP reference No.: 74000592
- Added to NRHP: July 30, 1974

The Rosemount Museum, pronounced "Rosemont" is a historic house museum in Pueblo, Colorado, it is situated on a square block at the corner of one of the highest points in north Pueblo and across the street from UCHealth Parkview Medical Center. It is a 24,000-square-foot, three story mansion with attic and basement and contains thirty-seven rooms. It was begun in 1891 and completed in 1893 for John A. Thatcher and his family. A 6,000-square-foot carriage house was also built on the property.

== History ==
John Thatcher moved from Pennsylvania to Colorado, where he prospered in the dry goods business before branching into banking, mining, and cattle ranching. He married Margaret Ann Henry of Platteville, WI in 1866. Built with pink Rhyolite volcanic rock for the exterior and a multitude of different woods for the interior; cherry, mahogany, maple and oak, the mansion housed the Thatcher family for decades. John, the patriarch of the family passed in 1913 and his last living child, Raymond C. Thatcher died in 1968.

After Raymond's death the mansion was donated to the city of Pueblo who in turn donated the property to the Metropolitan Museum Association. In 1969 a public trust was established by the Thatcher family for the creation of a nonprofit house museum.

Rosemount along with the Goodnight Barn were the first places in Pueblo County added to the National Register of Historic Places. Both were added on July 30, 1974.

== Collection ==
The house and most of its furnishings remain as they were when the family lived there.

The third floor houses the Andrew McClelland collection of artifacts. McClelland was a wealthy magnate and acquaintance of the family. He gathered the artifacts on his travels around the world including three Egyptian mummies, two of which were donated to the Denver Museum of Nature and Science. The last one remains in the third floor attic for the Rosemount's display.

== Media ==
- The interior of the Rosemount appears in the Terrence Malick directed film, Badlands. Where it serves as the interior of the rich man's (portrayed by John Carter) house.
- The Rosemount is featured in A&E's America's Castles in the episode "Frontier Castles" which originally aired in August 1994.
- The Rosemount is profiled in HGTV's "Christmas Castles" in an episode that aired December 24, 1999.
