= Thomas Edison National Historical Park =

National Historical Park of the United States

- U.S. National Register of Historic Places
- U.S. Historic district
- U.S. National Historical Park
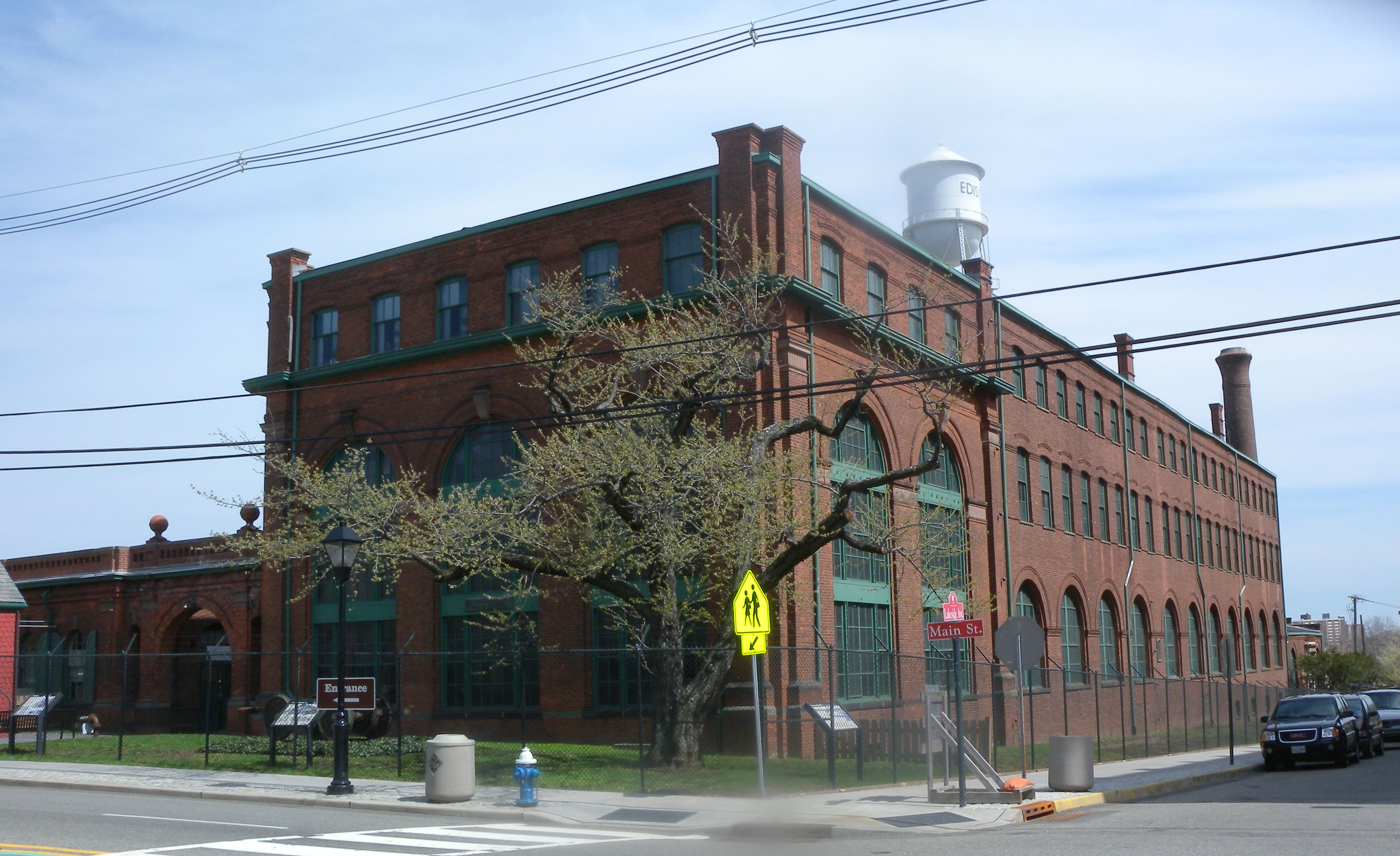
- Thomas Edison's Laboratory
- Interactive map showing Thomas Edison National Historical Park location
- Location: 211 Main Street, West Orange, NJ 07052
- Coordinates: 40°47′01″N 74°14′01″W
- Area: 21.25 acres (8.60 ha)
- Built: 1887
- Architect: H. Hudson Holly
- Architectural style: Late Victorian, Queen Anne
- Visitation: 22,370 (2025)
- Website: Thomas Edison National Historical Park
- NRHP reference No.: 66000052

Significant dates
- Added to NRHP: October 15, 1966
- Designated NHP: September 5, 1962 (as NHS, redesignated NHP March 30, 2009)

Thomas Edison National Historical Park preserves Thomas Edison's laboratory and residence, Glenmont, in West Orange, New Jersey, United States. These were designed, in 1887, by architect Henry Hudson Holly. The Edison laboratories operated for more than 40 years. Out of the West Orange laboratories came the motion picture camera, improved phonographs, sound recordings, silent and sound movies and the nickel-iron alkaline electric storage battery.

== Properties ==
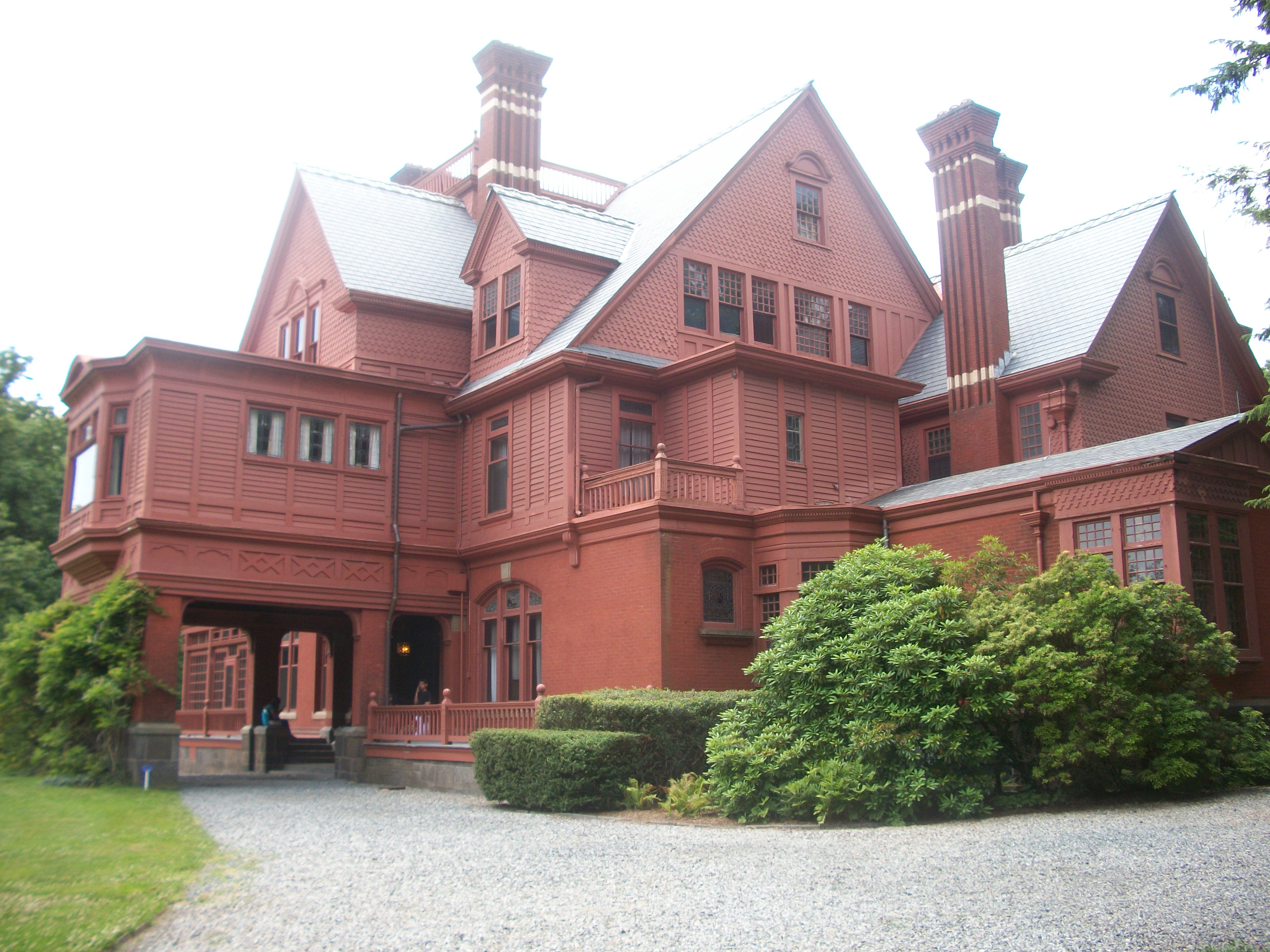
Glenmont, Edison's estate

The park comprises two properties in West Orange: the second Edison Laboratories complex and Edison's home in Llewellyn Park about .5 miles (0.80 km) to the west at 40°47′10″N 74°14′26″W.

The laboratory complex comprises the industrial facility built by Edison in 1887 to research and develop his inventions. The complex includes more than a dozen buildings that supported Edison's research into electricity, photography, motion pictures, chemistry, metallurgy and other disciplines. A private library was attached to the main laboratory building. Specialty heavy and precision machine shops made tooling and prototypes. Edison's Black Maria was the world's first movie studio, and the building could be rotated on a turntable to keep sunlight on film subjects. A replica of the Black Maria was constructed in 1954.

Edison's Queen Anne style home was designed by Henry Hudson Holly and built between 1880 and 1882 for Henry Pedder. It originally comprised 23 rooms. The mansion was built with gravity-convection central heat, indoor flush toilets, and hot and cold piped water. Pedder was found to have embezzled funds from his employer to build Glenmont, and was forced to surrender the estate, which Edison bought in 1886 for $125,000 (equal to $4,479,167 today), moving in with his newly married second wife Mina and his three children from his first marriage. The house retains its original furnishings in an Eastlake style interior. Edison added six more rooms, and electrical wiring.

Edison's children with Mina grew up at Glenmont, including future New Jersey governor Charles Edison and industrialist Theodore Miller Edison.

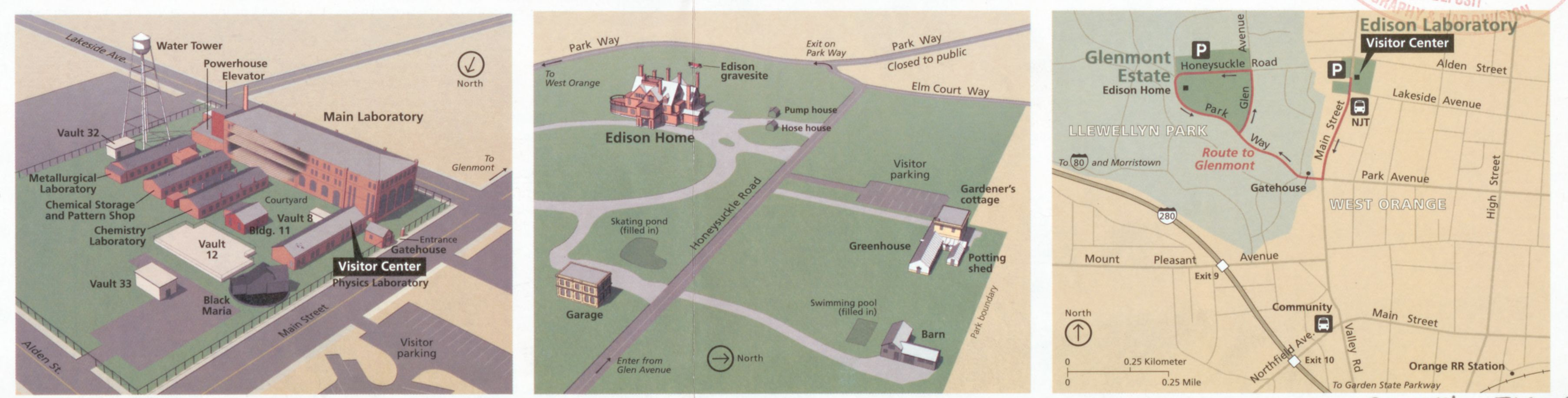
Map of laboratory complex and Edison's estate

== History ==
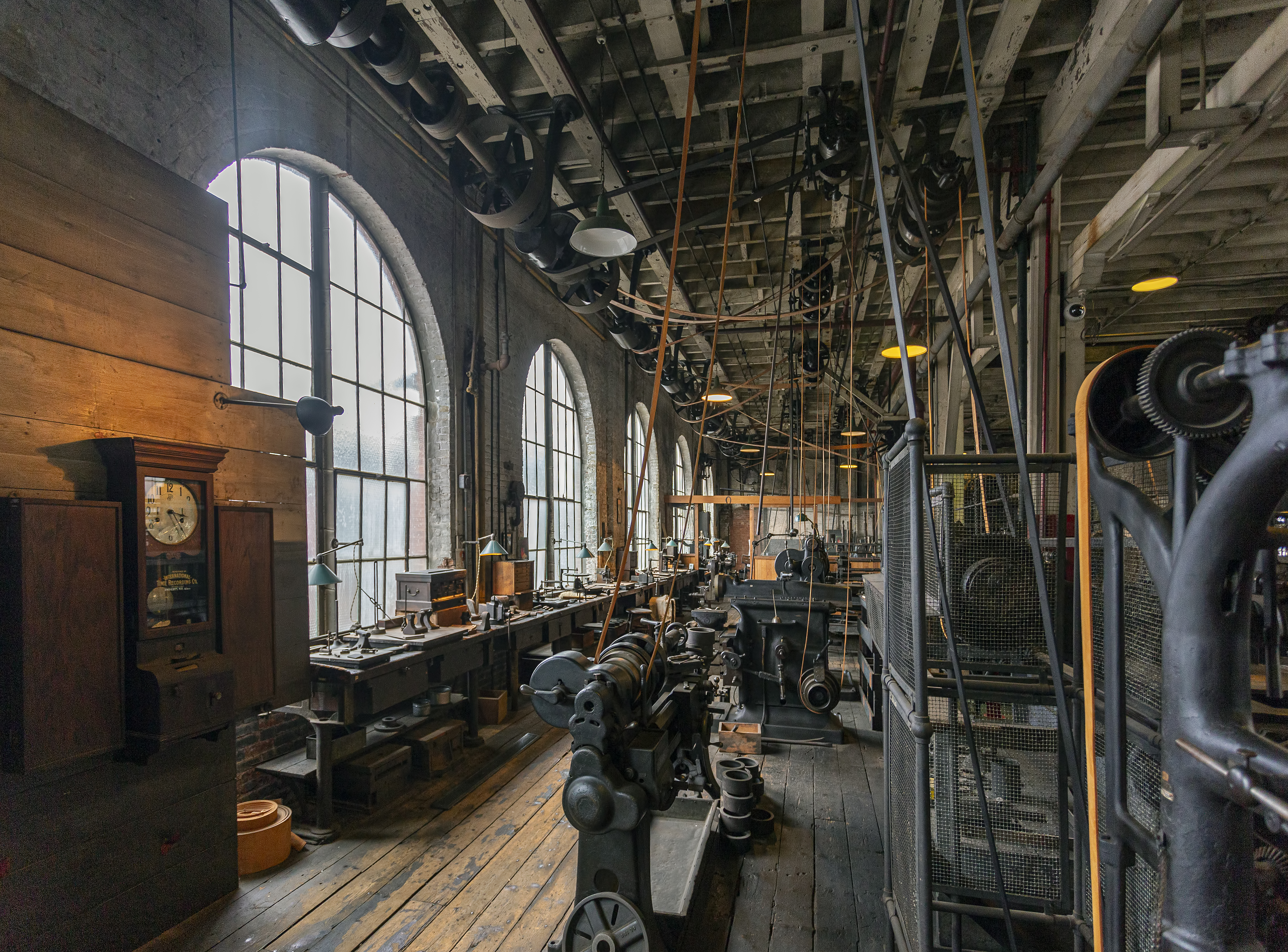
Interior view of the industrial complex

Edison's home was designated as the Edison Home National Historic Site on December 6, 1955. The laboratory was designated as Edison Laboratory National Monument on July 14, 1956. On September 5, 1962, the 21-acre (85,000 m^{2}) site containing the home and the laboratory were designated the Edison National Historic Site. On March 30, 2009, it was renamed Thomas Edison National Historical Park, adding "Thomas" to the title in hopes to relieve confusion between the Edison sites in West Orange and Edison, New Jersey. Following extensive renovations of the laboratory complex, there was a grand reopening on October 10, 2009.

== In popular culture ==
On April 27, 1996, the alternative rock band They Might Be Giants recorded four songs on phonograph cylinder at the museum. One of these recordings, of the song "I Can Hear You", appeared on their album Factory Showroom released later the same year. The other three songs ("Maybe I Know", "The Edison Museum", and "James K. Polk") were released on the band's website in 2002.

== See also ==
- Edison State Park
- Edison Storage Battery Company Building
- Thomas Alva Edison Memorial Tower and Museum
- National Register of Historic Places listings in Essex County, New Jersey
- List of museums in New Jersey
