= Auchentoroly Terrace Historic District =

Historic district in Maryland, US

- U.S. National Register of Historic Places
- U.S. Historic district
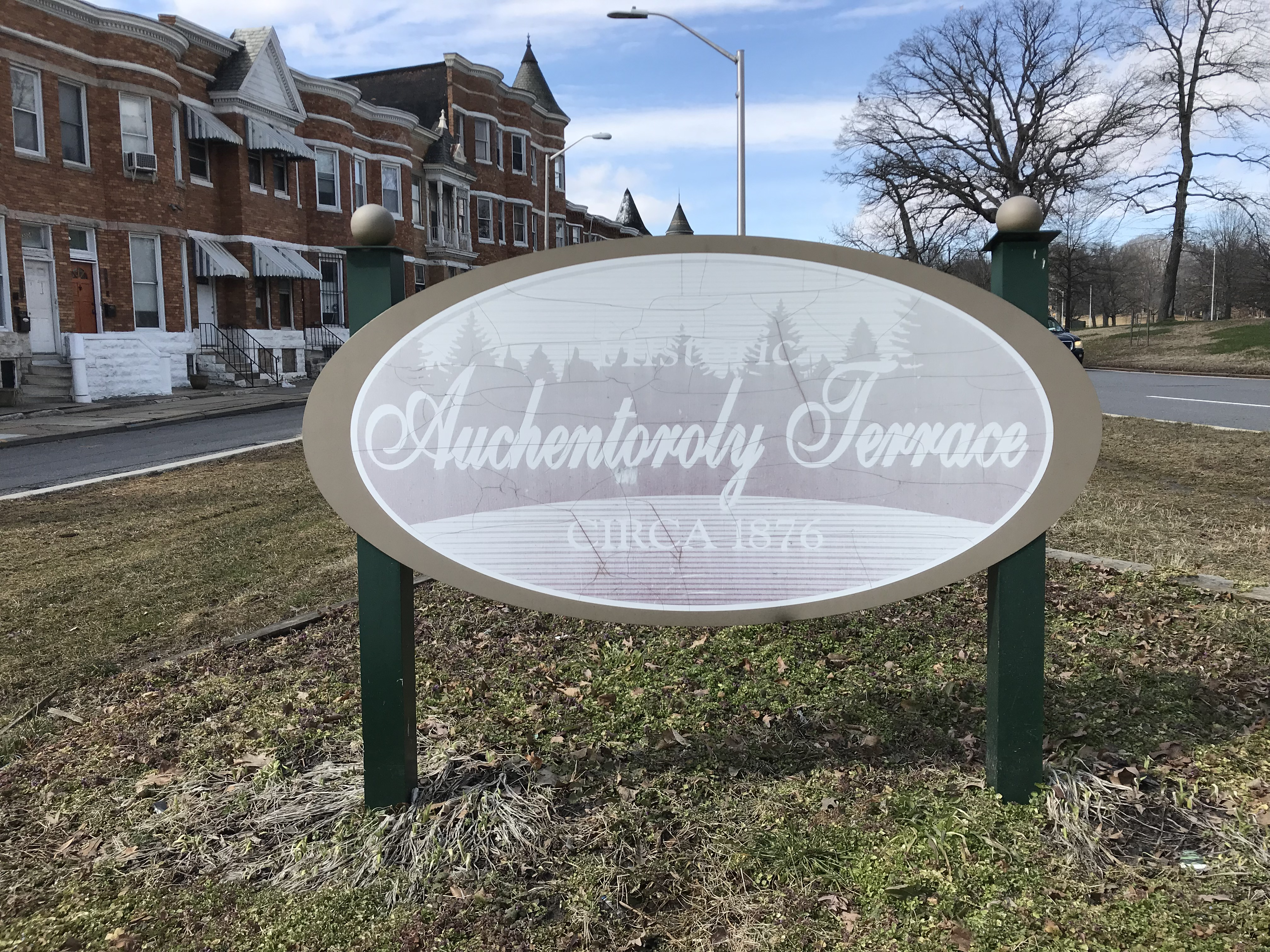
- A sign marks the entrance to Auchentoroly Terrace.

- Location within Baltimore Location within Maryland Location within the United States
- Location: Roughly bounded by Auchentoroly Terrace, Reisterstown Rd., Liberty Heights & Fulton Aves., Baltimore, Maryland
- Coordinates: 39°19′3″N 76°38′57″W
- Architect: Multiple
- Architectural style: Late Victorian
- NRHP reference No.: 15000604
- Added to NRHP: September 17, 2015

The Auchentoroly Terrace Historic District encompasses a residential district southwest of Druid Hill Park on the northwest side of Baltimore, Maryland. It is roughly bounded by Auchentoroly Terrace, Reisterstown Road, Liberty Heights Avenue, and Fulton Avenue. This area was developed between 1895 and 1911 with a series of large, fashionable townhouses, mainly in the Renaissance Revival style. Development was begun by the heirs of John Morris Orem, and largely finished by the Auchentoroloy Corporation, which acquired land not developed by the Orems.

The district was listed in the National Register of Historic Places in 2015.

== See also ==
- National Register of Historic Places listings in North and Northwest Baltimore
