= Nicholas Hasselbach =

German-American printer (c.1728–1769/70)

- Born: c. 1728
- Died: 1769 or 1770 (aged c. 42); Atlantic Ocean
- Children: 3

Nicholas Hasselbach (Note: Historian Isaac Thomas (1874) spells it as "Hasselbough". However, historians use the name of "Nicholas Hasselbach". On the only known surviving piece of printing by him, the spelling of "Hasselbach" is inscribed. In Daniel Rupp's 1876 account of German and other immigrants to Philadelphia he uses the German spelling of "Nicklaus Hasselbach".) (c. 1728 (Note: date of birth is only established by one circumstantial event - see explanation in text) – 1769 or 1770) was a German-American printer, part of a mass migration from Germany who emigrated to Philadelphia in the mid-18th century. (Note: Thomas, 1874, maintains Hasselbach was born in Pennsylvania, which is not consistent with other historical accounts, that Hasselbach migrated from Germany to Philadelphia in 1749.) He operated a paper mill near Philadelphia, after which he removed to Baltimore, Maryland, where he established that city's first printing press. He was one of the few German speaking printers who that wanted to print religious literature in German. Hasselbach died unexpectedly as a relatively young man, leaving only one known example of his printing, a small book, now owned by a private collector.

== Early years ==
Born in early 18th-century Germany, little is known of Hasselbach's childhood, education, specific religion and other involvements. There is speculation among historians whether Hasselbach is the same "Johannes Nicolaus Wilhelmus Haselbach" whose birth occurred on December 15, 1728, in Raubach, Prussia, and who was christened four days later. Part of a mass migration of Germans and other ethnic groups to Philadelphia, Hasselbach traveled aboard the ship Elliot. (Note: The Elliot was commanded by James Adams, from Rotterdam. The Elliot was one of more than 324 ships that brought German pioneers to the port of Philadelphia, between the years 1727 to 1775.) According to historian Ralph Strassburger, the largest number of ships arriving in Philadelphia during a single year was twenty-two, in the year 1749, the year Hasselbach is claimed to have arrived from Rotterdam. Professor Daniel Rupp obtained the names of ships and those aboard arriving at Philadelphia, from the files in the Secretary's Office, at Harrisburg, Pennsylvania, and had them published in a single work, entitled A Collection of Thirty Thousand Names, etc. (Note: The first edition was published in 1856 which became out of print in little time. Rupp published a revised and expanded edition in 1876.) The dates of arrival in the Rupp account differ from those offered by Strassburger's similar work of 1934. Rupp has the arrival date of the Elliot to Philadelphia noted as October 25, 1748. Strassburger, however, who published a work containing signatures reproduced from photographs of ship's passenger lists, has the arrival date of the Elliot noted as August 24, 1749.

== Printer ==
In the papers of Christopher Saur, August 1, 1755, Hasselbach is mentioned as "papermaker in the late Mr. Koch's paper mill on the Wissahicken" (Wissahickon Creek), just outside Philadelphia. In 1757, John Johnson sold his paper mill to Hasselbach. As a journeyman, Hasselbach learned the printing trade from Christopher Saur an accomplished and noted printer in Germantown in 1765. In 1762, Hasselbach arrived in Chestnut Hill, Philadelphia in Philadelphia and established a press shop with Anthony Armbruester, (Note: Armbruester was for a short time a partner with Benjamin Franklin.) a printer who for many years had printed numerous works in German, including school books and other small works, which he also printed in English. Hasselbach became his silent partner.

Hasselbach moved from Philadelphia and lived in Baltimore for several years where he established the first printing house in that city in 1765. He may have arrived as late as April 1764, but about a year later, on July 6, 1765, Thomas Harrison transferred to him the lot in Baltimore Town next to the Market House, which was located at what is now the northwest corner Baltimore and Gay Streets. According to historians this is the likely location Hasselbach established his printing operation. He soon made other purchases of property in succeeding years. He was well supplied with printing types for printing in both the German and English languages. During this time the newspapers of Philadelphia and Annapolis were the only source of news for the people of Baltimore, while there was no practical printer located in Baltimore proper, until the arrival of Hasselbach.

The only known surviving example of Hasselbach's printing bearing the name of Nicholas is a pamphlet entitled, A Detection of the Conduct and Proceedings of Messrs. Annan and Henderson ... at an Oxford, Pennsylvania Meeting-House, on April 18, 1764, authored by John Redick, a record involving a dispute between various members of a Presbyterian Church at Marshes Creek, near Gettysburg. The small forty-seven-page book, bearing his printer name is the earliest known example of printing produced in Baltimore, and the only known specimen produced by Hasselbach's Baltimore press. (Note: The Hasselbach book was first received by George W. McCreary, who was the Assistant Secretary and Librarian at the Maryland Historical Society in the summer of 1902. He turned the book over to Robert Garrett Esq., of Baltimore, who passed it on to his brother John, the proprietor of the Evergreen Museum & Library in Baltimore, where it sits today.) In addition, a printed petition survived, which was commissioned by the people of Baltimore and addressed to the Governor and Assembly of Maryland, and circulated throughout the county, urging that the county seat be located in Baltimore on the Patapsco River, rather than in Joppa. There is no actual proof that this petition was from Hasselbach's press, but as he was the only capable printer in Baltimore during this time, historian Lawrence C. Wroth speculated that he was the likely printer.

== Final years ==
Hasselbach went abroad on a business venture, the details of which remain unknown, and was lost at sea in late 1769 or early 1770, leaving behind a wife and three children in Maryland. According to the Baltimore public record, his last business dealing in Baltimore involved a land transaction, conducted on October 26, 1769. Before his death, he had plans for printing the Bible in German. After his death, Baltimore was without a printer for nearly three years.

His widow, Catherine Hasselbach, in 1773, moved his business and printing wares from Chestnut Hill to Baltimore, after which she sold his printing materials to William Goddard, who in turn sold part of them to Francis Bailey, a printer in Lancaster. (Note: When Goddard printed The Baltimore Advertiser and The Maryland Journal, in 1773, he was using Hasselbach’s types.) Among Hasselbach's personal effects was a collection of twenty-one violins. The total value of his estate was appraised at over £1,675 sterling, which would approximately be the equivalent of $355,000 in the 21st century.

== See also ==
- List of early American publishers and printers
- History of printing
- History of Baltimore
- History of Pennsylvania

== Bibliography ==
- Bidwell, John (2013). American Paper Mills, 1690-1832. Dartmouth College Press, in association with The Antiquarian Society. ISBN 978-1-5846-59648.
- Bigwood, Jas. Goldsborough (2015). "The Sestercentennial of Baltimore's First Printing Press".
- McCreary, George Washington (1903). The First Book Printed in Baltimore-Town: Nicholas Hasselbach, Printer; the Book Reprinted with a Sketch of Hasselbach's Life and Work. Press of Kohn & Pollock. Book available at HathiTrust, Digital Library
- Rupp, Daniel (1876). A collection of upwards of thirty thousand names of German, Swiss, Dutch, French and other immigrants in Pennsylvania from 1727 to 1776. Philadelphia : Leary, Stuart.
- Scharf, John Thomas (1874). The chronicles of Baltimore : being a complete history of "Baltimore town" and Baltimore city from the earliest period to the present time. Baltimore : Turnbull Brothers.
- Scharf, John Thomas (1881). History of Baltimore city and county, from the earliest period to the present day. Philadelphia, L.H. Everts.
- Seidensticker, Oswald (1893). The first century of German printing in America, 1728-1830. Philadelphia : Schaefer & Koradi.
- Strassburger, Ralph Beaver; Hinke, William John (1934). Pennsylvania German pioneers; a publication of the original lists of arrivals in the port of Philadelphia from 1727 to 1808. Vol. II. Norristown, Penn. : Pennsylvania German Society.
- Thomas, Isaiah (1874). The history of printing in America, with a biography of printers. Vol. I. New York, B. Franklin.
- Wroth, Lawrence C. (1922). A History of Printing in Colonial Maryland, 1686–1776. Baltimore : Typothetae of Baltimore.
- Wroth, Lawrence C. (1938). The Colonial Printer. Portland, Me., The Southworth-Anthoensen press.
- "Wooden printing presses - St. Mary's City". 2015.
