= Stieff Silver Company Factory =

- U.S. National Register of Historic Places
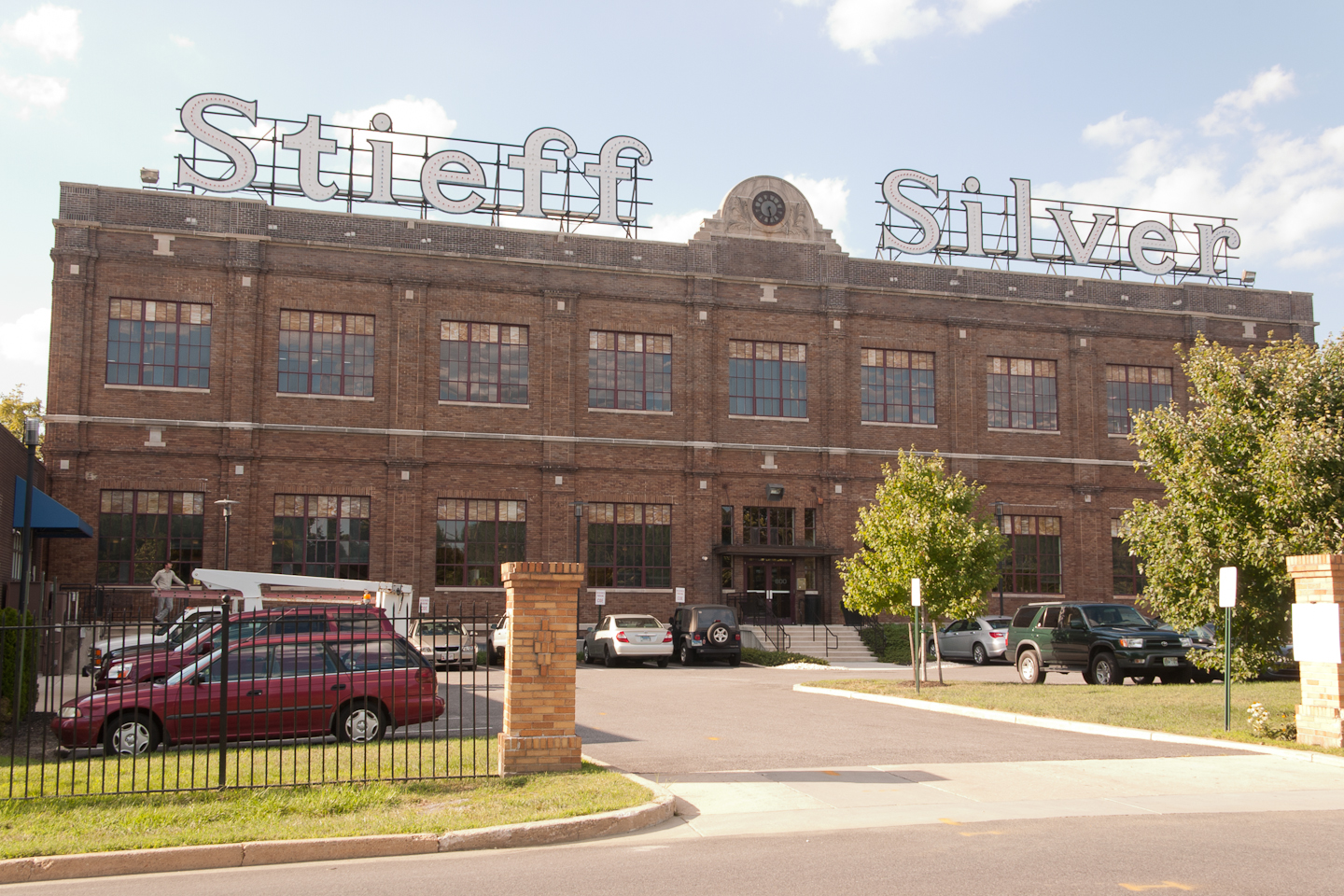
- Stieff Silver Company Factory, August 2011

- Location within Baltimore Location within Maryland Location within the United States
- Location: 800 Wyman Park Dr., Baltimore, Maryland
- Coordinates: 39°19′20″N 76°37′45″W
- Area: 2.6 acres (1.1 ha)
- Built: 1925
- Architects: Pietsch, Theodore Wells
- Architectural style: industrial
- NRHP reference No.: 00000744
- Added to NRHP: June 30, 2000

Stieff Silver Company Factory is a historic silver factory located at Baltimore, Maryland, United States. It is a two-story nine-bay rectangular brick factory building, designed by Theodore Wells Pietsch and built in two stages in 1925 and 1929. The exterior features a lighted sign flanking a central clock that rises above a parapeted roof. The Stieff Silver Company was the last of the Baltimore silverware manufacturers, operating between 1892 and 1999.

Stieff Silver was sold to Lenox (owned at the time by Brown-Forman Corporation) in 1990, where it continued to produce silver until 1999, when it was bought by Struever Bros., Eccles & Rouse. The building was leased by Johns Hopkins University until 2017, when it was bought by the university to house the Materials Characterization and Processing facility alongside various other engineering laboratories.

Stieff Silver Company Factory was listed on the National Register of Historic Places in 2000.
