= Richard Guy Wilson =

American architectural historian

Richard Guy Wilson (born 1940) is an American architectural historian and Commonwealth Professor in Architectural History at the University of Virginia.

Wilson was born and raised in Los Angeles (residing in a house designed by Rudolph Schindler). He received his B.A. at the University of Colorado in 1963, and his M.A. and Ph.D. at the University of Michigan in 1968 and 1972 respectively. Wilson taught at Michigan and Iowa State University before moving to the University of Virginia in 1976. He received the outstanding professor award at Virginia in 2001.

He has directed the Victorian Society's Nineteenth Century Summer School since 1979; it has been located in Boston, Philadelphia and currently Newport, RI.

Wilson's research and writing has focused on American architecture from the 18th to the 20th centuries. He has authored, co-authored or edited over a dozen books. He has served as an advisor and commentator for a number of television programs on PBS, C-SPAN, History Channel and A&E; he frequently appeared on the A&E program America's Castles.

== Published works ==
The following are published works by Wilson.

=== Books authored ===
- Wilson, Richard Guy, and Robinson, Sidney K., The Prairie School in Iowa, Iowa State University Press, Ames IA 1977
- Wilson, Richard Guy, McKim, Mead & White, Architects, Rizzoli, New York 1983; ISBN 0-8478-0491-7
- Wilson, Richard Guy, Honor and Intimacy: Architectural Drawings by AIA Gold Medalists, 1907-1983, American Institute of Architects Foundation, Washington DC 1984.
- Wilson, Richard Guy, The AIA Gold Medal, McGraw-Hill, New York 1984; ISBN 0-07-070810-X
- Wilson, Richard Guy, Pilgrim, Dianne H., and Tashjian, Dickran, The Machine age in America, 1918-1941, Brooklyn Museum in association with Abrams, New York 1986; ISBN 0-8109-1421-2
- Wilson, Richard Guy, and Butler, Sara A., The Campus Guide: University of Virginia, Princeton Architectural Press, New York 1999; ISBN 1-56898-168-6
- Wilson, Richard Guy, The Colonial Revival House, H.N. Abrams, New York 2004; ISBN 0-8109-4959-8
- Wilson, Richard Guy, "Harbor Hill, Portrait of a House, W W Norton, 2008.

=== Books edited ===
- Wilson, Richard Guy, and Robinson, Sidney K. (editors), Modern Architecture in America: Visions and Revisions, Iowa State University Press, Ames IA 1991; ISBN 0-8138-0381-0
- Wilson, Richard Guy (editor), Buildings of Virginia: Tidewater and Piedmont, Oxford University Press, Oxford and New York 2002; ISBN 0-19-515206-9
- Wilson, Richard Guy, Eyring, Shaun and Marotta, Kenny (editors), Re-creating the American Past: Essays on the Colonial Revival, University of Virginia Press, Charlottesville VA 2006; ISBN 0-8139-2348-4

=== Other contributions ===
- Brawer, Catherine Coleman and Kathleen Murphy Skolnil, The Art Deco Murals of Hildreth Meière, photographs by Hildreth Meière Dunn, foreword by Richard Guy Wilson, Andrea Monfried Editions, New York, 2014.
