= Edison Storage Battery Company =

American company

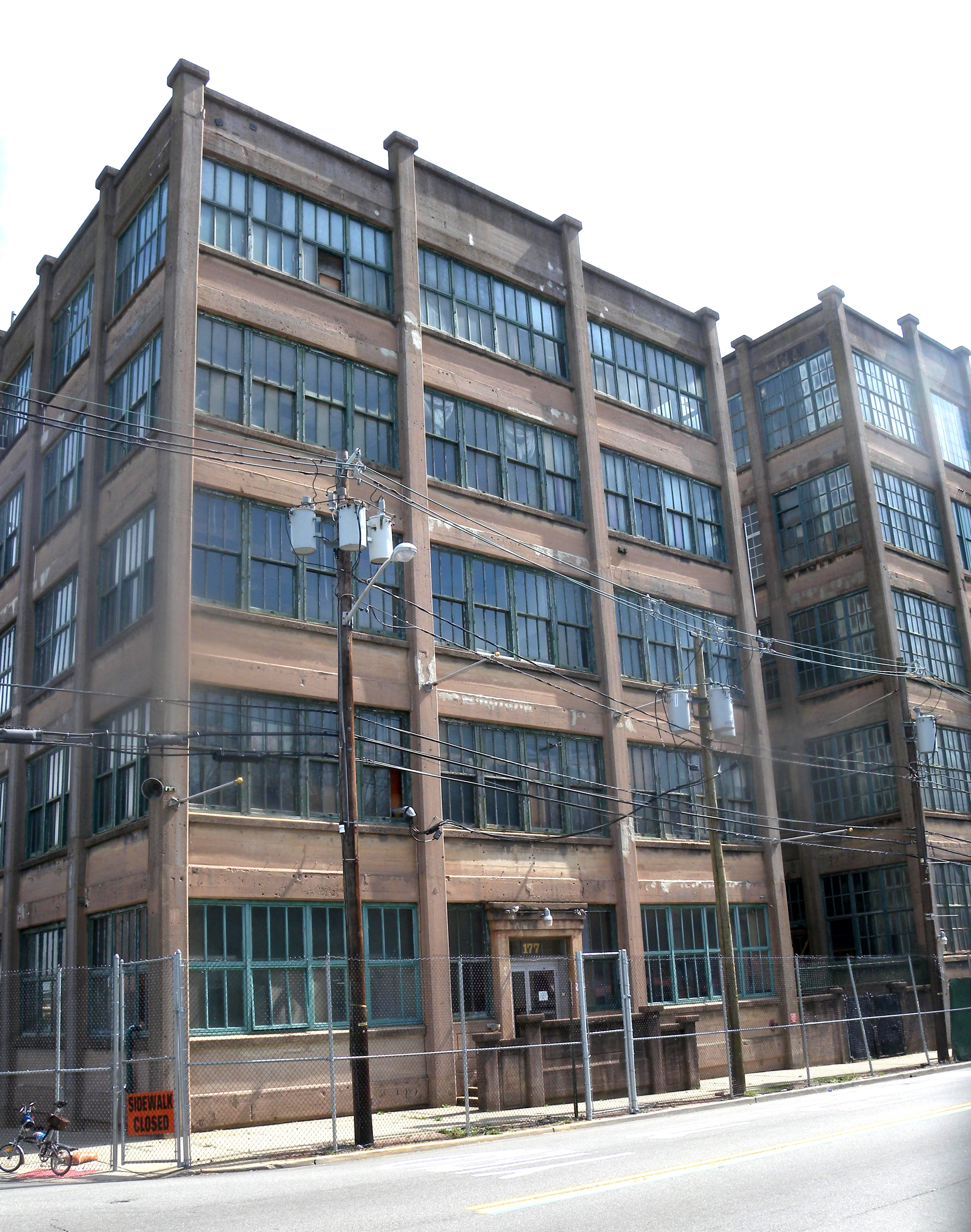
The Edison Storage Battery Company Building

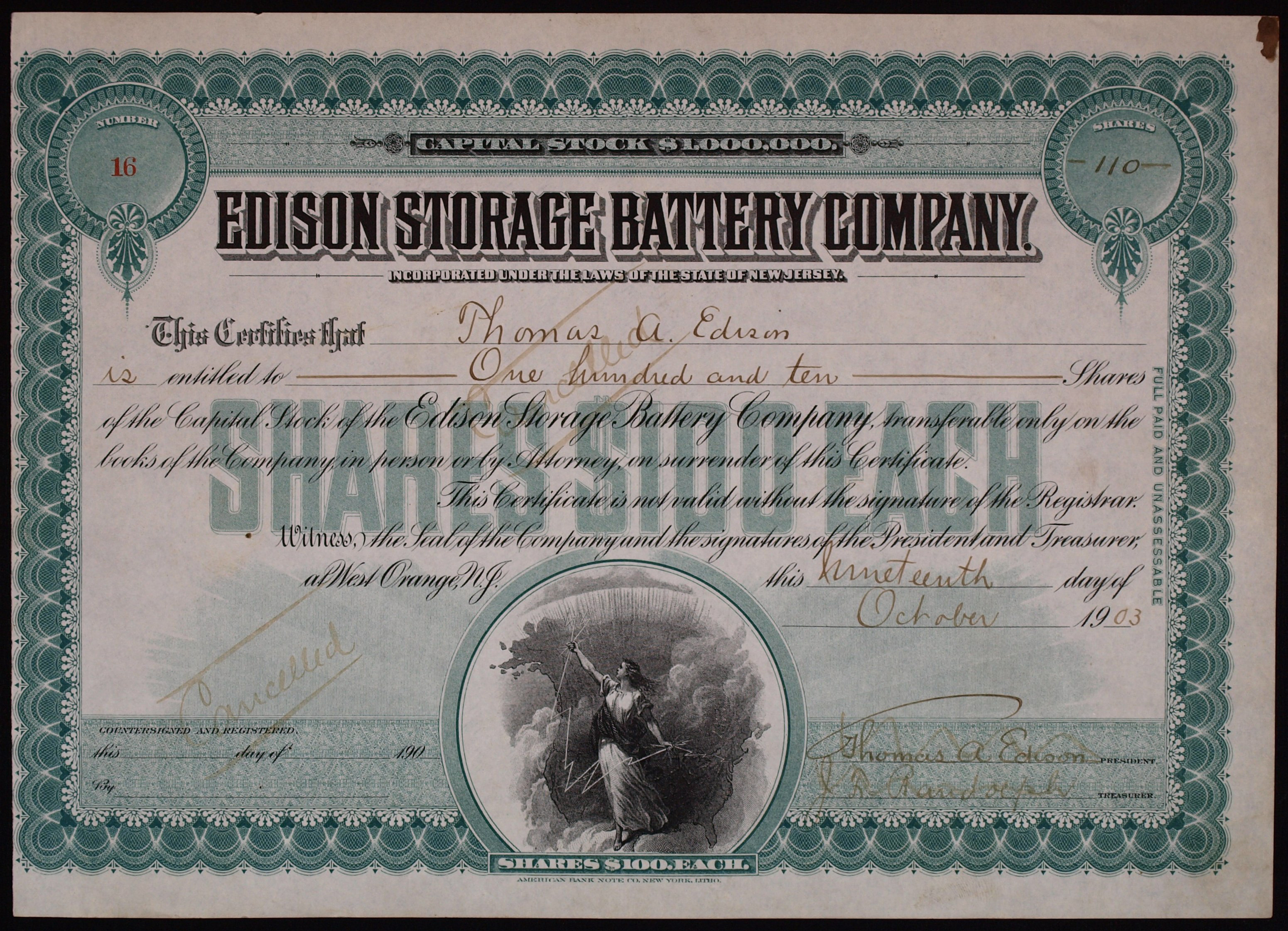
Share of the Edison Storage Battery Company, issued 19. October 1903

The Edison Storage Battery Company manufactured a type of nickel–iron battery developed by Thomas Edison from 1903 to 1932.

Dissatisfied with the heavy lead-acid battery, Edison developed a type of nickel–iron battery (invented by Waldemar Jungner) that was about 40% lighter for the same amount of energy stored and, he claimed, could be recharged twice as fast. He filed the first of numerous battery patents, for "Reversible Galvanic Cells or so-called Storage Batteries", on November 20, 1900, which was granted on January 12, 1901. He used it to power an electric car that could go twice as fast as conventional vehicles.

On May 27, 1901, he founded the Edison Storage Battery Company to manufacture it, with production commencing in 1903. The Edison Storage Battery Company Building was (and is) located at 177 Main Street in West Orange, New Jersey. (The building was added to the National Register of Historic Places on February 28, 1996.) However, the battery had its problems, forcing Edison to take it off the market in late 1904. An improved model was released in 1909; while it was a success, less-expensive, faster and longer-ranged gas-powered cars, especially Henry Ford's Model T, saw to it that electric cars lost their popularity (38% of the market in 1910, behind steam-powered cars at around 40%, but ahead of gas-powered automobiles at 22%). Edison had to be satisfied with other markets for the product: powering mining lamps, train lighting and signaling and submarines, among other things.

The United States Navy blamed the battery (and leaking hydrogen gas) for an explosion and resulting fire during testing aboard the submarine USS E-2 on January 15, 1916. Four men were killed, and seven injured. A board of inquiry (including Lieutenant Chester W. Nimitz) recommended that Edison batteries be barred from Navy submarines until the problems were fixed.

On June 30, 1932, the company became the Storage Battery Division of Thomas A. Edison, Inc.
