= Edison Storage Battery Company Building =

- U.S. National Register of Historic Places
- New Jersey Register of Historic Places
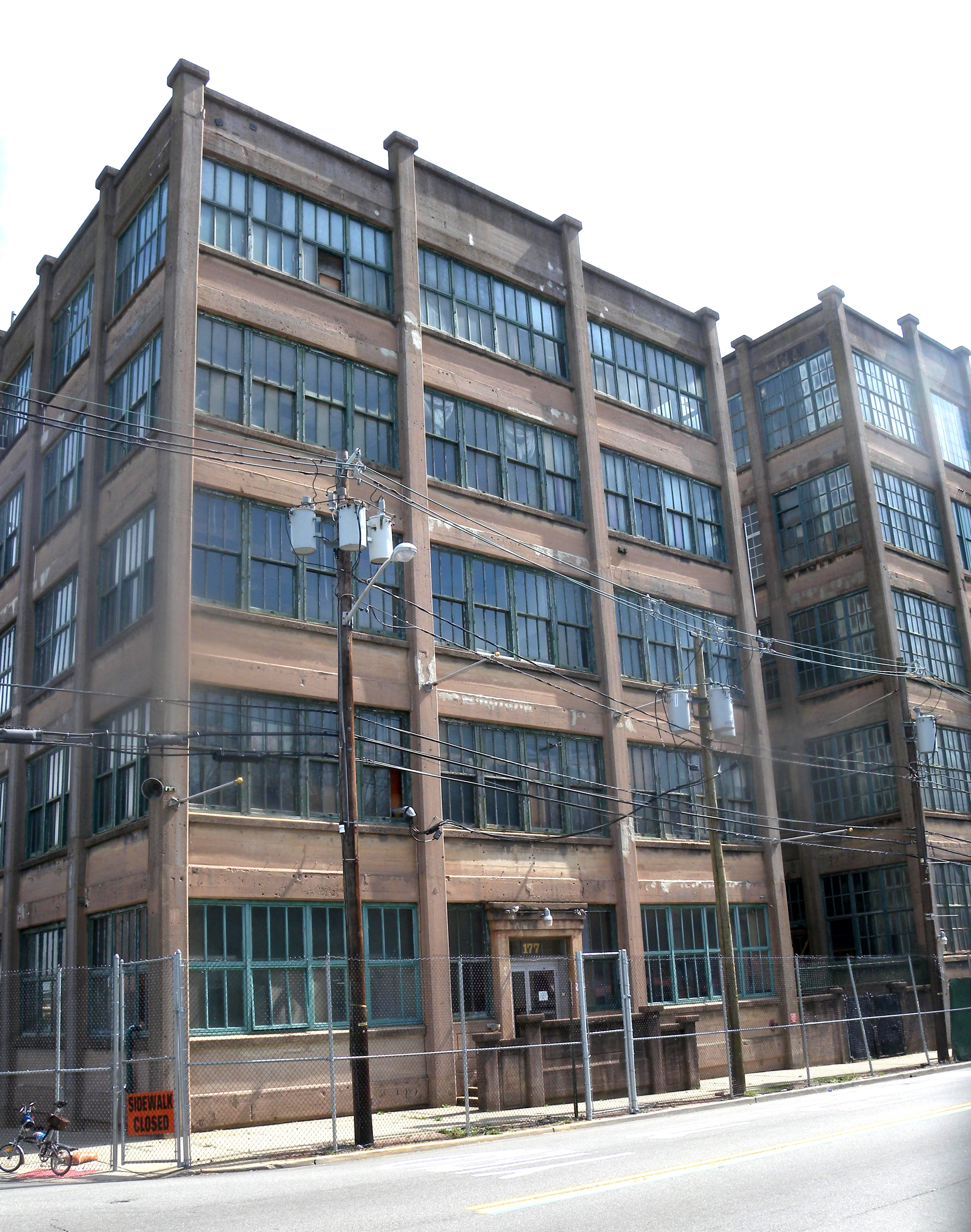
- Factory

- Location within Essex County, New Jersey Location within New Jersey Location within the United States
- Location: 177 Main Street, West Orange, New Jersey
- Coordinates: 40°47′0″N 74°14′4″W
- Area: 4.4 acres (1.8 ha)
- Architectural style: Late 19th And Early 20th Century American Movements
- NRHP reference No.: 96000055
- NJRHP No.: 3151

Significant dates
- Added to NRHP: February 28, 1996
- Designated NJRHP: December 8, 1995

Edison Storage Battery Company Building, is located at 177 Main Street and Lakeside Avenue in West Orange, Essex County, New Jersey, United States. The building was added to the National Register of Historic Places on February 28, 1996.

The building was a manufacturing facility for Edison Storage Battery Company to make nickel-iron batteries developed by Thomas Edison in 1901. Manufacturing began around 1903 and was discontinued in 1975 when Edison Storage was sold to Exide.

== See also ==
- National Register of Historic Places listings in Essex County, New Jersey
- Thomas Edison National Historical Park
