= Waverly Main Street Historic District =

Historic district in Maryland, United States

- U.S. National Register of Historic Places
- U.S. Historic district
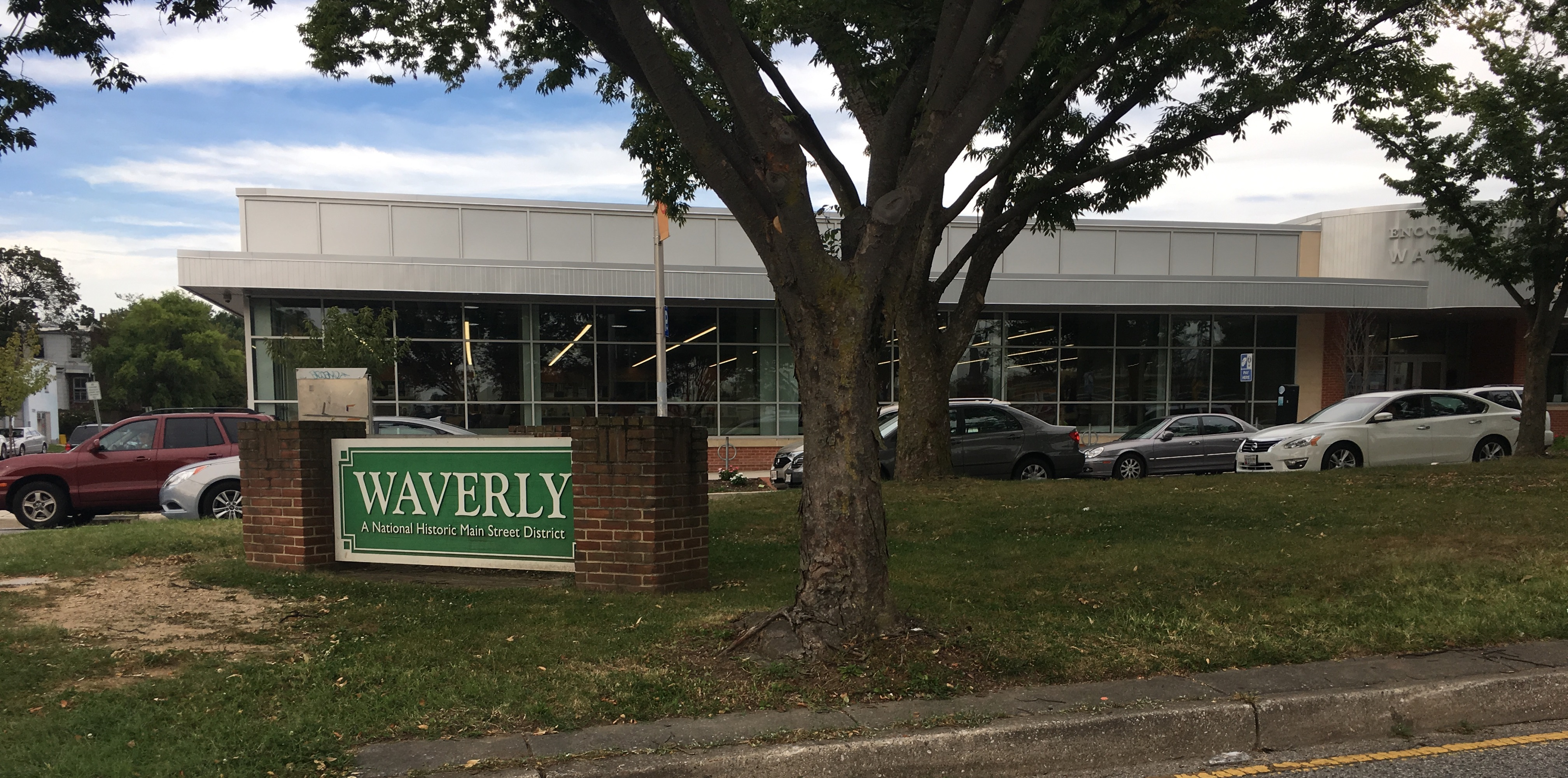

- Location within Baltimore Location within Maryland Location within the United States
- Location: Roughly bounded by E. 29th & E. 35th Sts., Old York Rd., Greenmount Ave., Baltimore, Maryland
- Coordinates: 39°19′42.3″N 76°36′33.9″W
- Area: 31 acres (13 ha)
- NRHP reference No.: 13001020
- Added to NRHP: December 31, 2013

The Waverly Main Street Historic District is a predominantly commercial historic district on the northwestern side of Baltimore, Maryland. This commercial nexus built up in the late 19th through mid 20th centuries as the city expanded along York Turnpike. The district extends along Greenmount Avenue, between Exeter Hall Avenue and East 35th Street, and includes some properties on adjacent streets.

The district was listed on the National Register of Historic Places in 2013.
