= Rosalie Plantation Sugar Mill =

- U.S. National Register of Historic Places
- Location within Louisiana Location within the United States
- Nearest city: Alexandria, Louisiana
- Coordinates: 31.20231°N 92.41173°W
- Area: 2 acres (0.81 ha)
- Built: c.1847
- Architect: Gervais Ballio
- NRHP reference No.: 76000974
- Added to NRHP: January 2, 1976

The Rosalie Plantation Sugar Mill is located in Rapides Parish, Louisiana near Alexandria, Louisiana. It was listed on the National Register of Historic Places in 1976.

It is a one-story 104 by 40 feet (32 m × 12 m) stepped gable brick building, built by slave labor for owner Gervais Ballio in about 1847.

It is located south of Alexandria off U.S. 71/U.S. 167.
