= Brown's Arcade =

Historic building in Maryland, USA

- U.S. National Register of Historic Places
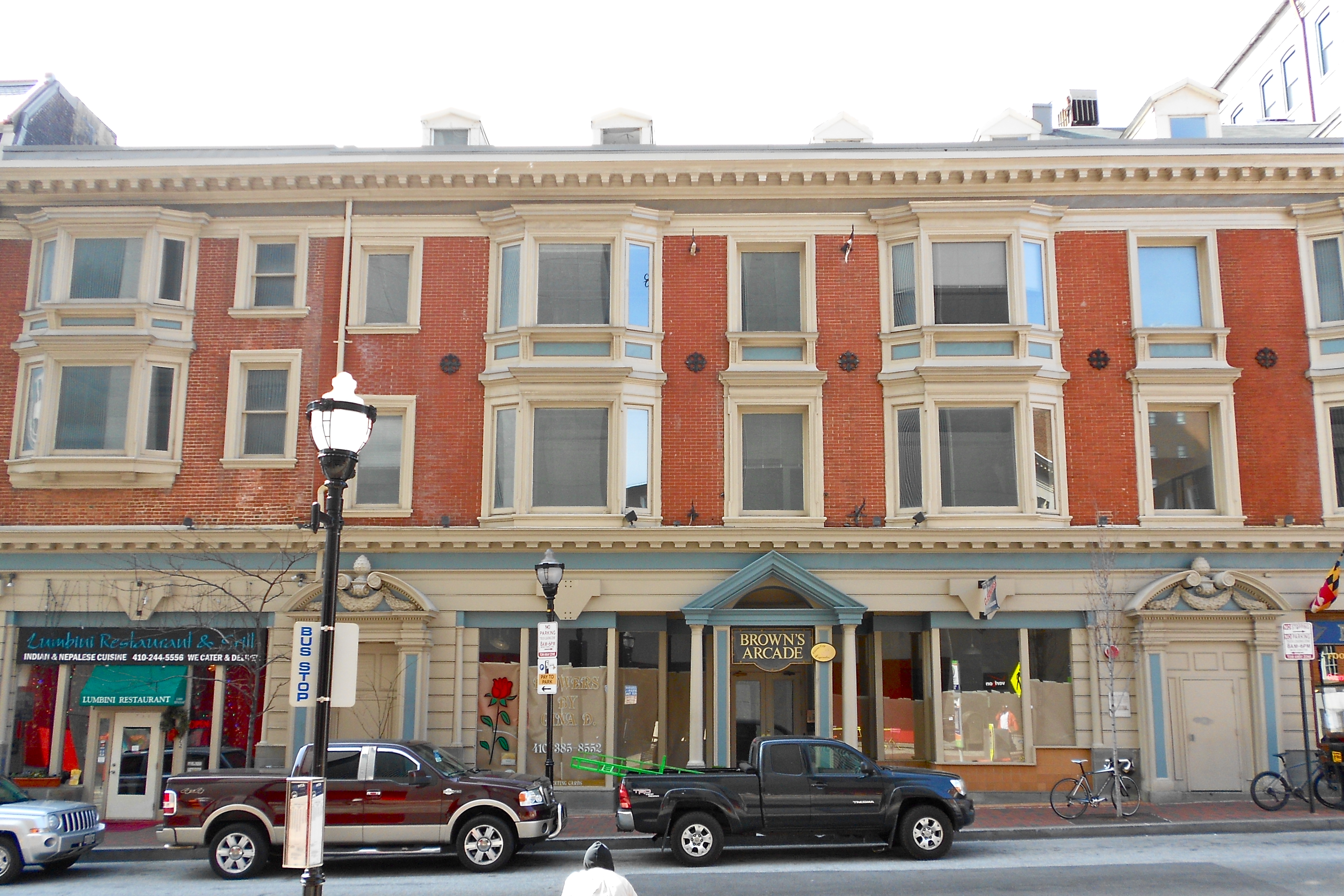
- Browns Arcade, March 2012

- Location within Baltimore Location within Maryland Location within the United States
- Location: 322–328 N. Charles St., Baltimore, Maryland
- Coordinates: 39°17′36″N 76°36′56″W
- Area: 0.5 acres (0.20 ha)
- Built: 1904
- Architect: Brauns, Henry
- Architectural style: Colonial Revival
- NRHP reference No.: 83002927
- Added to NRHP: January 17, 1983

Brown's Arcade is a historic retail and office building located in Baltimore, Maryland, United States. It consists of four early 19th century brick rowhouses. Architect Henry F. Brauns redesigned a row of four, three-story buildings in 1904 into the original Brown's Arcade, with the application of Colonial Revival details over the original Federal-style façade. It was converted to a series of small shops; bordering a straight central walkway with offices above. The rear courtyard contains two-story brick structures with shed roofs and a two-story Renaissance Revival style structure.

Brown's Arcade was listed on the National Register of Historic Places in 1983.

== Brown's Arcade (shopping arcade) ==
The four buildings that make up Brown's Arcade were originally early 19th-century brick rowhouses on North Charles Street. In 1904, architect Henry F. Brauns redesigned the row as Brown's Arcade, a shopping arcade that extended from Charles Street west to Saratoga Street. The conversion added Colonial Revival details to the older Federal-style buildings and created a central walkway lined with small shops, with office space above.

In 1940 the Calvert Hall building at 16 West Saratoga Street was demolished for parking, and the arcade was closed. The North Charles Street stores were later modernized, and much of the rear shop and office space remained vacant.
