= Ruscombe (Baltimore) =

Historic house in Maryland, United States

- U.S. National Register of Historic Places
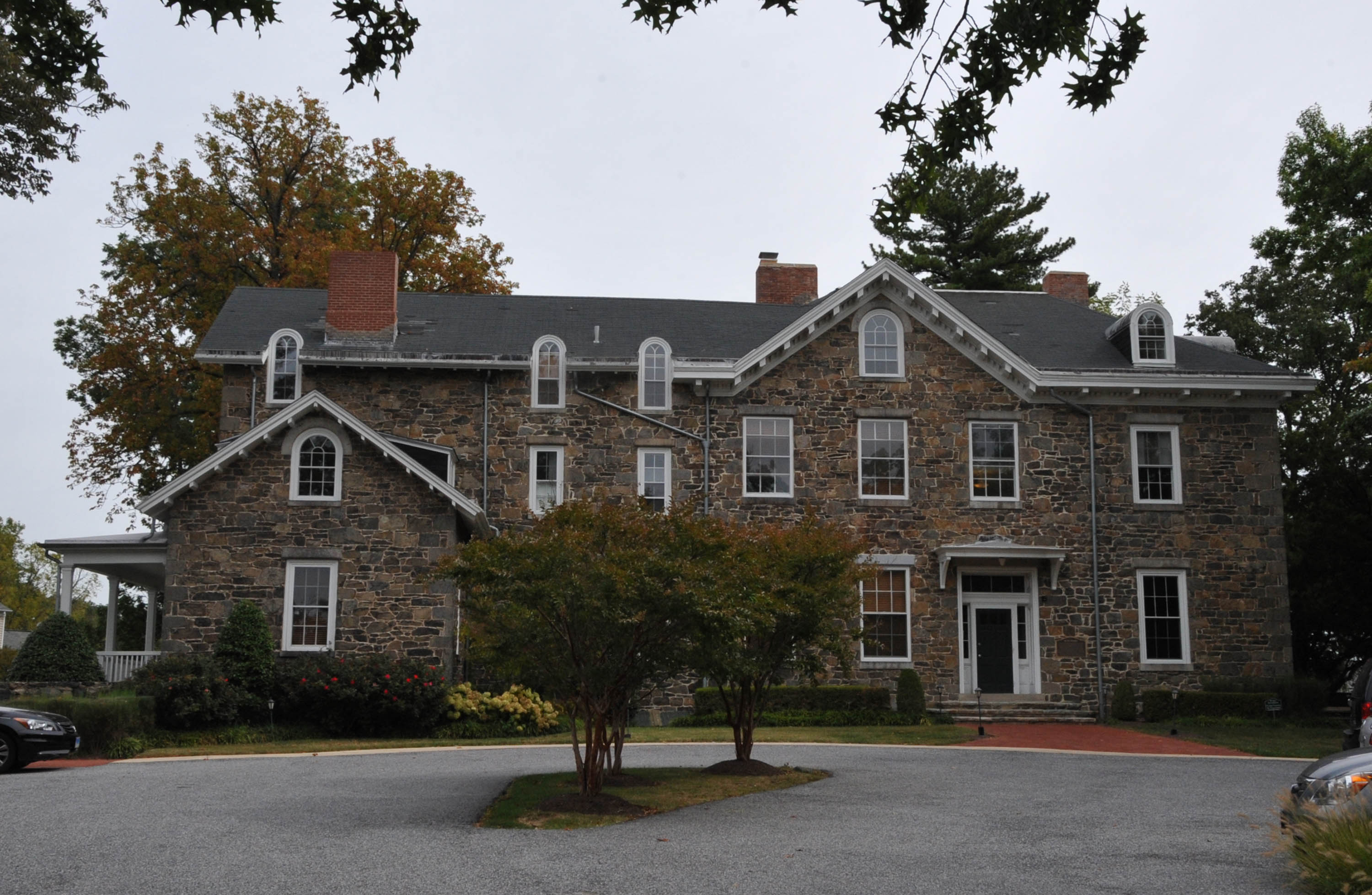

- Location within Baltimore Location within Maryland Location within the United States
- Location: 4901 Springarden Dr., Baltimore, Maryland
- Coordinates: 39°20′59″N 76°39′30″W
- Area: 1.4 acres (0.57 ha)
- Built: 1866
- Architect: Kemp, Joseph
- Architectural style: Italian Villa
- NRHP reference No.: 07001033
- Added to NRHP: December 20, 2007

Ruscombe is a historic home located at Baltimore, Maryland, United States. It is a 2 1/2-story Italianate mansion with basement, constructed of fieldstone in 1866. It is a gable and hip roofed building. The main block of the building is 50 feet by 50 feet, with a gable-roofed L-shaped wing. It was designed by Baltimore architect Joseph F. Kemp, who is credited with the design of Camden Station.

Ruscombe was listed on the National Register of Historic Places in 2007.
