= Riviera Apartments =

Historic building in Maryland, USA

- U.S. National Register of Historic Places
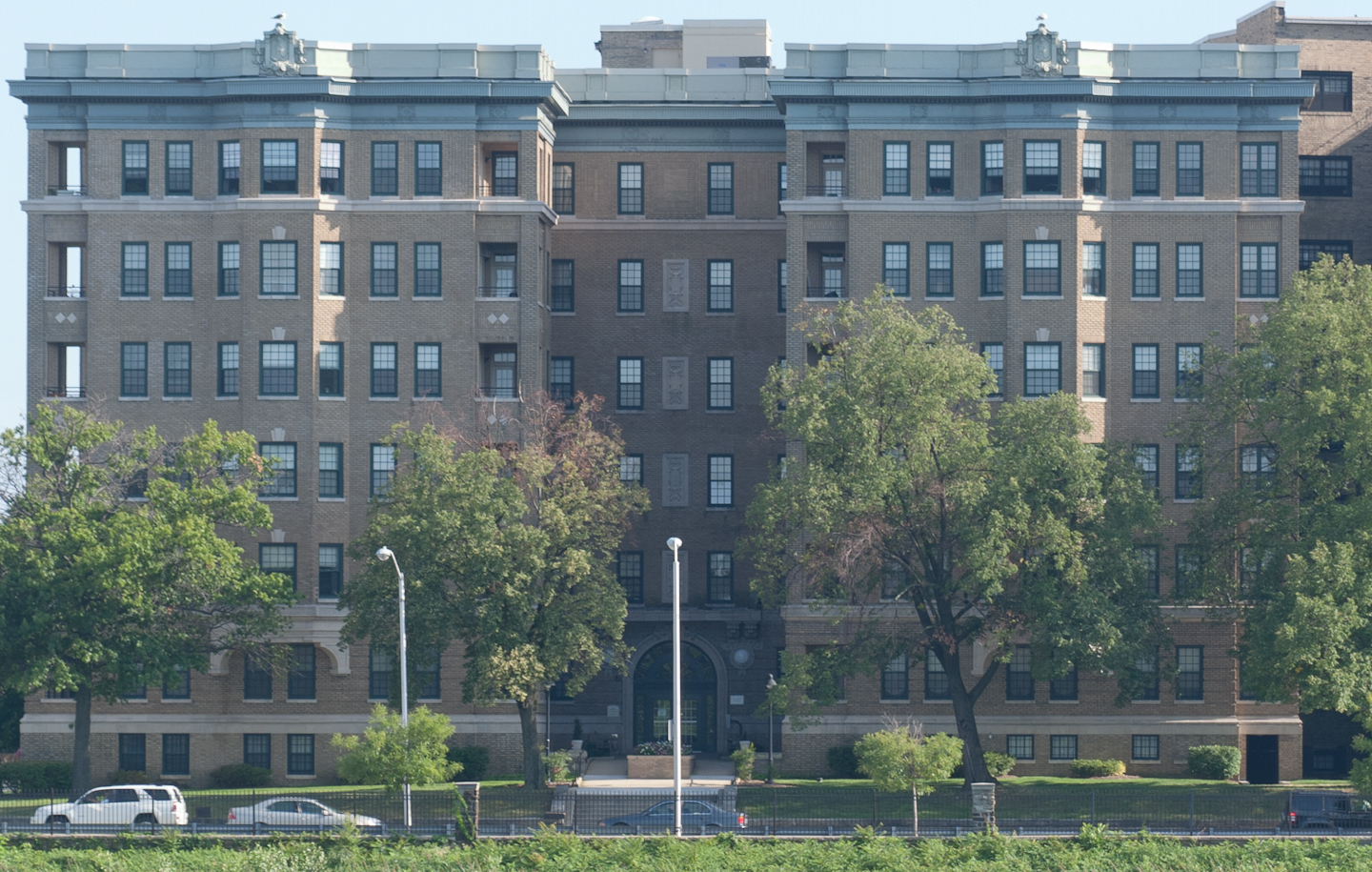
- Riviera Apartments, August 2011

- Location within Baltimore Location within Maryland Location within the United States
- Location: 901 Druid Park Lake Dr., Baltimore, Maryland
- Coordinates: 39°18′59.8″N 76°38′11.6″W
- Area: 0.5 acres (0.20 ha)
- Built: 1915
- Architects: Freund, John
- Architectural style: Classical Revival
- NRHP reference No.: 99000985
- Added to NRHP: August 12, 1999

Riviera Apartments is a historic apartment building located at Baltimore, Maryland, United States. It is a six-story, brick and cast stone apartment building built in 1915.

Riviera Apartments was listed on the National Register of Historic Places in 1999.
