= Northern District Police Station =

Historic police station in Maryland, USA

- U.S. National Register of Historic Places
- Baltimore City Landmark
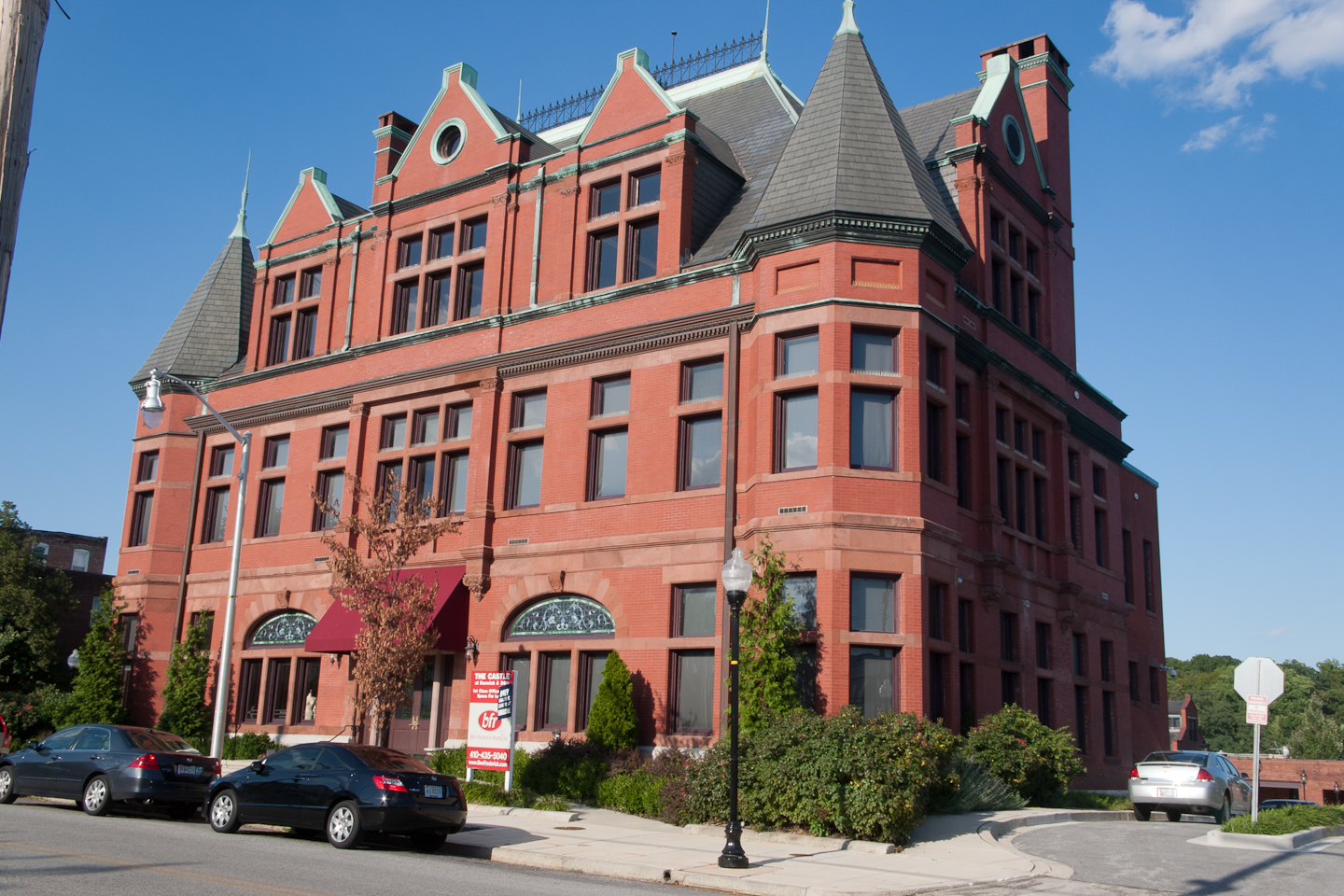
- Northern District Police Station, August 2011
- Interactive map of Northern District Police Station
- Location: 3355 Keswick Rd., Baltimore, Maryland
- Coordinates: 39°19′42.6″N 76°37′39.5″W
- Area: 1.1 acres (0.45 ha)
- Built: 1899
- Architect: Brauns, Henry
- Architectural style: Late Victorian, Renaissance
- NRHP reference No.: 01001372

Significant dates
- Added to NRHP: December 28, 2001
- Designated BCL: 2000

Northern District Police Station (aka "The Castle at Keswick") is a historic police station located at Baltimore, Maryland, United States. It is a complex of interconnected buildings designed in the late Victorian/French Renaissance style consisting of a three-story main station house with a hipped roof and dormers; a connected two story building which had originally housed the cellblock; and a pair of hipped roof garages which were originally used as livery buildings. They are in turn connected to an L-shaped building consisting of the original clerestoried stable and flat roofed garage. The buildings encircle a courtyard which is now used as a parking lot. It was designed by Henry F. Brauns in 1899.

Northern District Police Station was listed on the National Register of Historic Places in 2001. Maryland Historical Trust said it was the "best and most intact example" of Victorian/French Renaissance in Baltimore. It is one three remaining police stations from the period.

On November 10, 2025, a multiple-alarm fire involving 100 fire fighters caused "serious" damage to the building. The roof burned and collapsed, and the third floor, location of the original gymnasium, was destroyed.
