= Samester Parkway Apartments =

- U.S. National Register of Historic Places
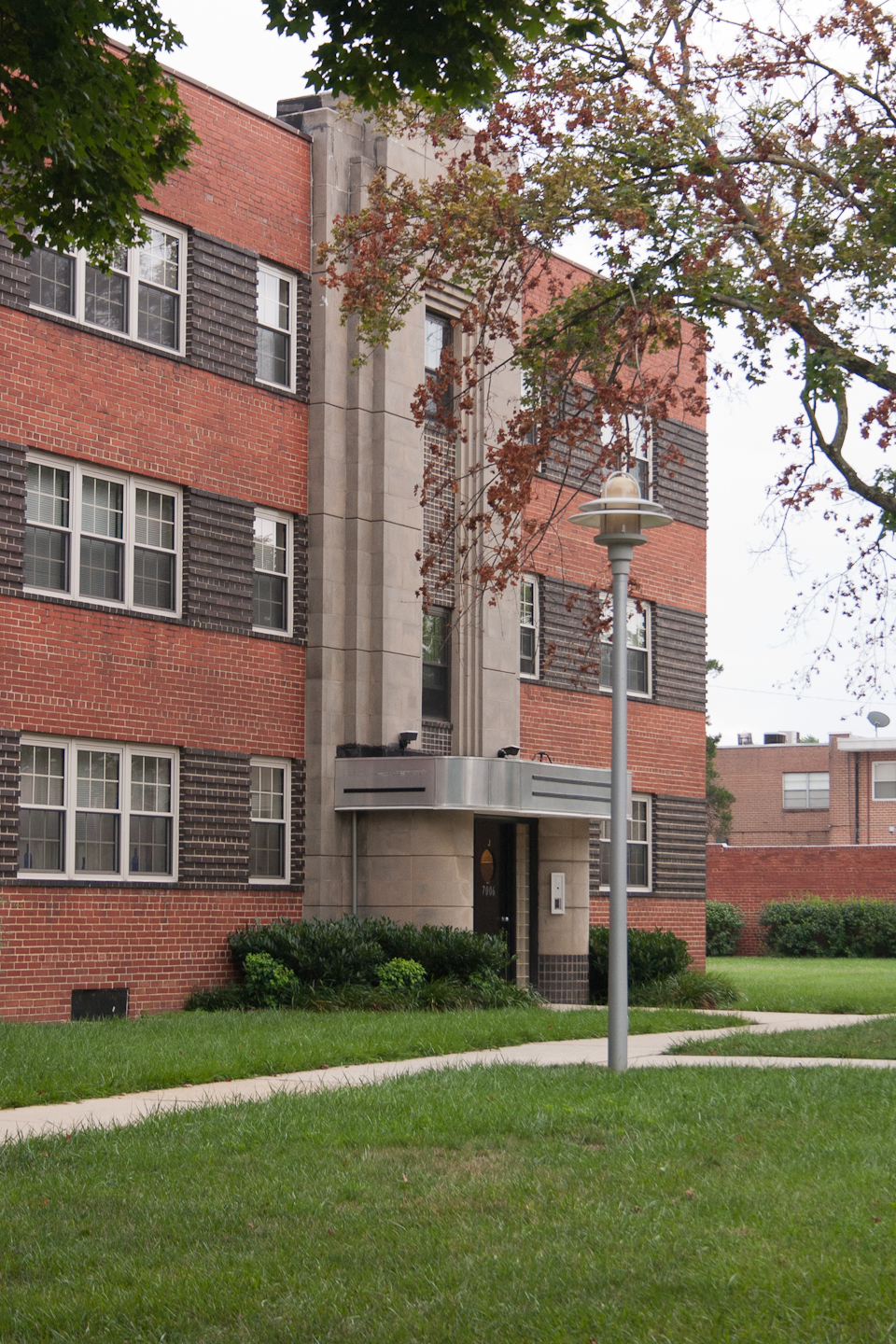
- Samester Parkway Apartments, August 2011

- Location within Baltimore Location within Maryland Location within the United States
- Location: 7000-7022 Park Heights Ave., Baltimore, Maryland
- Coordinates: 39°21′58″N 76°42′23″W
- Area: 3.5 acres (1.4 ha)
- Built: 1939
- Architect: Miller, Hal A.; Hammerman, S.L.,
- Architectural style: Art Deco
- NRHP reference No.: 98001157
- Added to NRHP: September 9, 1998

Samester Parkway Apartments is a historic apartment complex in Baltimore, Maryland, United States. The 72-unit complex consists of two symmetrical detached wings, massed as stacked chevrons of six apartment buildings each, that face each other across a central courtyard. They are three-story, red brick, garden apartment structures. The complex was constructed in 1939 in the Art Deco style. It is an early example of Federal Housing Administration-financed garden apartments in Baltimore and is an excellent example of the American translation of European modern architectural style. On May 28, 2004, 3 children were beheaded in the apartments.

Samester Parkway Apartments was listed on the National Register of Historic Places in 1999.
