= Lake–Evesham Historic District =

Historic district in Maryland, United States

- U.S. National Register of Historic Places
- U.S. Historic district
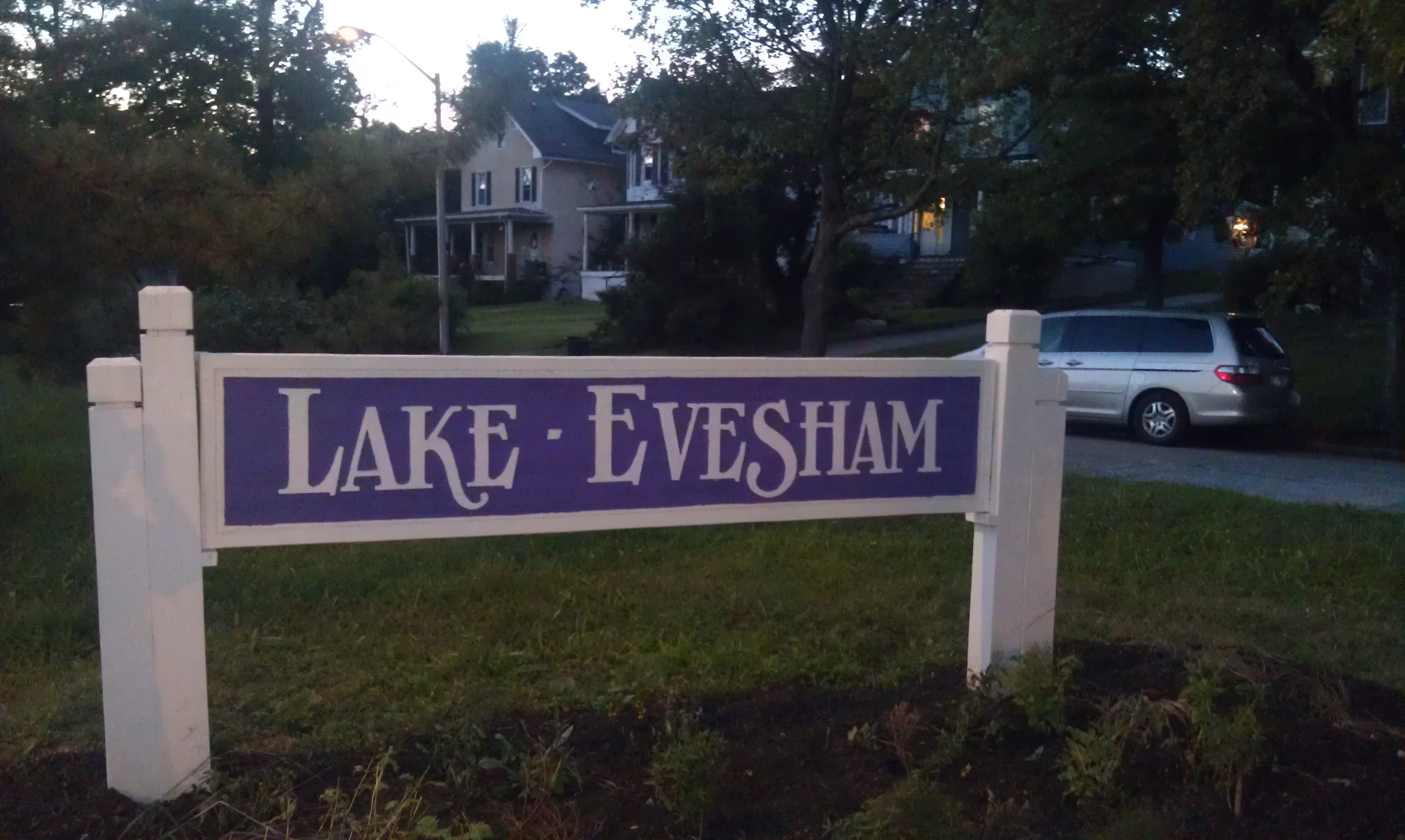
- Lake–Evesham Historic District, September 2012

- Location within Baltimore Location within Maryland Location within the United States
- Location: Roughly bounded by East Lake Ave., York Rd, Evesham Ave., and Bellona Ave., Baltimore, Maryland
- Coordinates: 39°22′6″N 76°36′49″W
- Area: 45.5 acres (18.4 ha)
- Architectural style: Late Victorian, Late 19th And 20th Century Revivals, Bugalow
- NRHP reference No.: 03001323
- Added to NRHP: December 23, 2003

Lake–Evesham Historic District is a national historic district in Baltimore, Maryland, United States. It incorporates 260 buildings representing its development over the period 1870–1946. The majority of buildings in the district are bungalows and houses in various revival styles built in the 1920s and 1930s, when Lake Evesham was actively developed as a residential suburb.

It was added to the National Register of Historic Places in 2003.
