= Evergreen Museum & Library =

Museum in Baltimore, Maryland, United States

- Evergreen House
- U.S. National Register of Historic Places
- Baltimore City Landmark
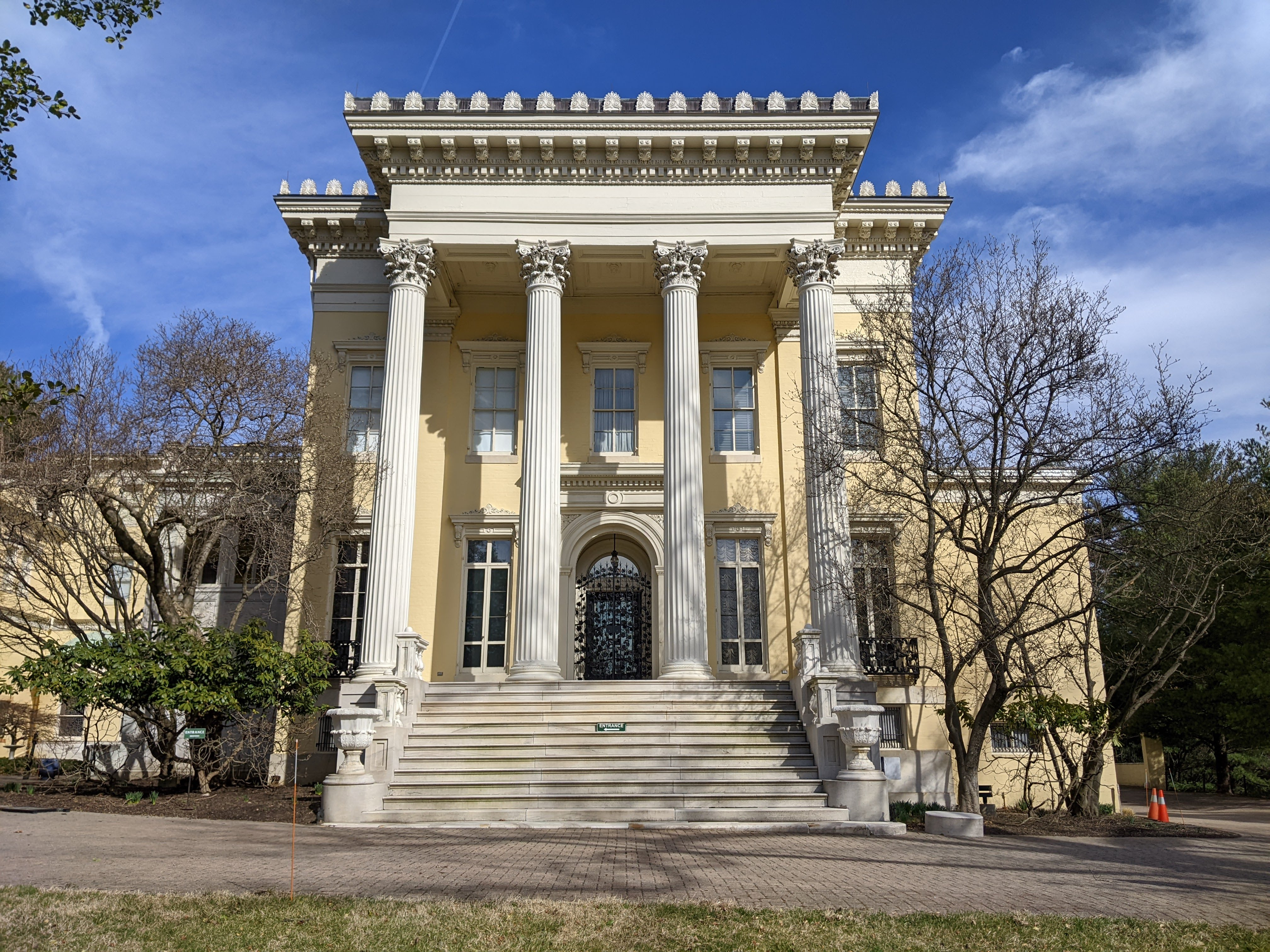
- Interactive map of Evergreen House
- Location: 4545 N. Charles St., Baltimore, Maryland, United States
- Coordinates: 39°20′56.6″N 76°37′15.2″W
- Area: 17 acres (6.9 ha)
- Built: 1857-1858
- Architects: Multiple, including Laurence Hall Fowler
- Architectural style: Classical Revival, Renaissance
- NRHP reference No.: 83002932

Significant dates
- Added to NRHP: January 17, 1983
- Designated BCL: 1975

Evergreen Museum & Library is a historic house museum and research library in Baltimore, Maryland, United States. It is located between the campuses of the Notre Dame of Maryland University and Loyola University Maryland. It is operated by Johns Hopkins University along with Homewood Museum; both make up the Johns Hopkins University Museums.

== History ==
The mansion was built in the mid-19th century and bought in 1878 by the president of the Baltimore and Ohio Railroad, John W. Garrett. Railroads were then a key industry in the United States and, as Baltimore's Garrett family owned and managed one of the biggest rail companies, the home grew and became both luxurious and famous. John Garrett's son Thomas Harrison Garrett added a wing containing a billiard room, bowling alley, and a gymnasium, which in later years were converted into an art gallery and private theater. Evergreen served as a home for the family until 1952, when it was donated to the university.

It was listed on the National Register of Historic Places in 1983.

== Architecture ==
The house, a magnificent example of Gilded Age architecture, sits on a 26 acres (11 ha) landscaped site in Northern Baltimore and is on the National Register of Historic Places. The initial design was a more modest Italianate house but, with the Garretts, it became a 48-room mansion with a 23-karat gold plated bathroom, a 30,000-book library, and a theatre painted by famous Russian artist Léon Bakst. The abundant decorative items in the house reflect the Garretts' travels and interests, including a red Asian room displaying Japanese and Chinese items, works by Picasso, Modigliani, and Degas, glass by Tiffany or Dutch marquetry.

Today, the university manages the museum and offers guided tours.

== Library ==
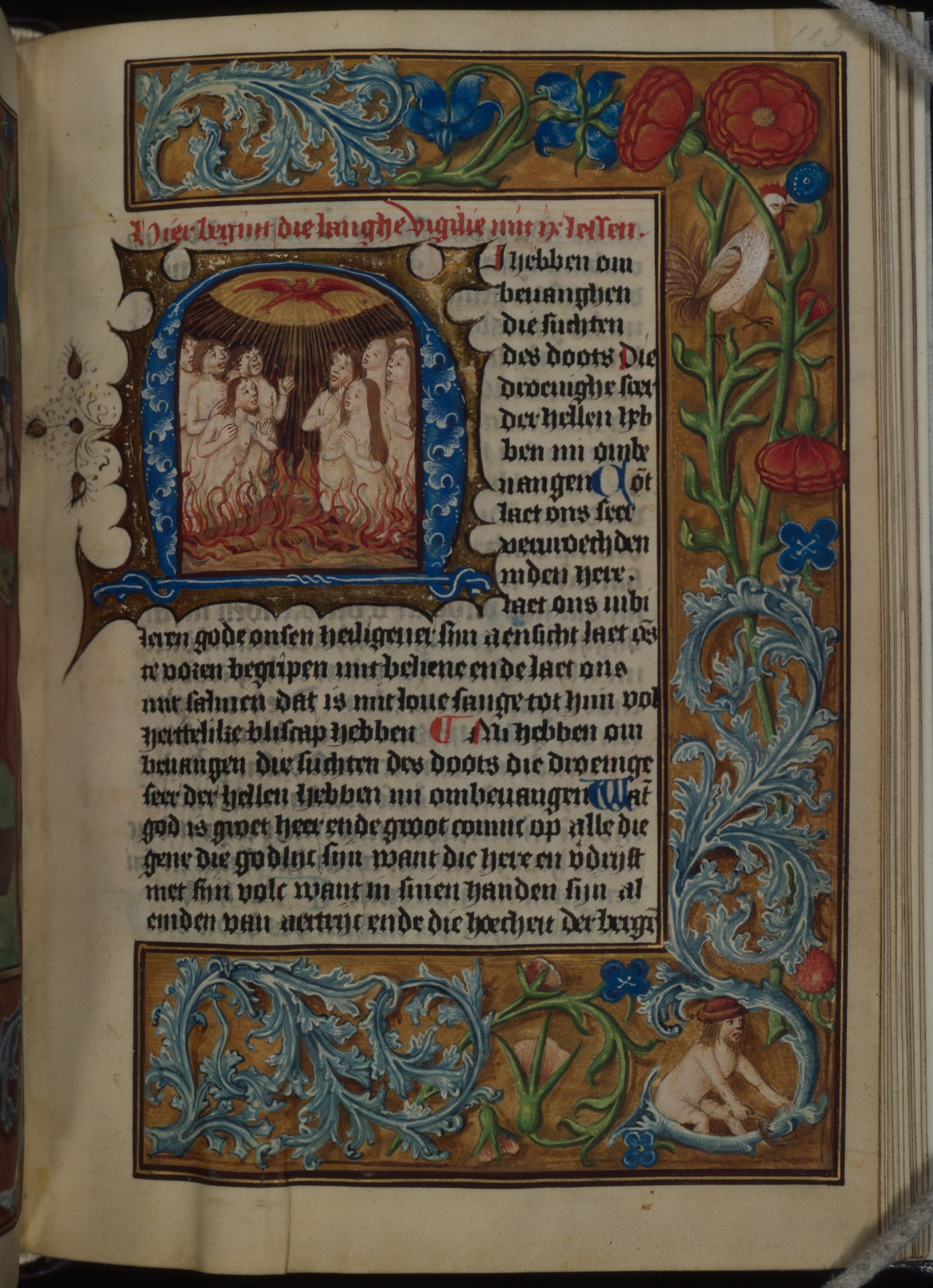
Late 15th century Dutch book of hours from the John Work Garrett Library

The John Work Garrett Library is under the aegis of the Department of Special Collections at the Johns Hopkins University. The collection totals over 30,000 volumes, the majority of which were collected by John Work Garrett (1872–1942) and his father, Thomas Harrison Garrett (1849–1888). The collection is especially strong in literature of the English Renaissance, including the Shakespeare Folios of 1623, 1632, and 1663. Other collection strengths include natural history, such as the original pattern plates for James Sowerby's Mineral Conchology of Great Britain, travel literature, architecture, and early Americana, such as the manuscript of The History of the Ancient and Honorable Tuesday Club by Alexander Hamilton. It also has a small but choice collection of incunabula and books of hours.

The museum holds the earliest known example of printing produced in colonial Maryland; a small booklet printed by Nicholas Hasselbach, who set up the first printing shop in Baltimore in 1765.

== Sources ==
- Wroth, Lawrence C. (1922). A History of Printing in Colonial Maryland, 1686–1776. Baltimore : Typothetae of Baltimore.
