= H.F. Miller & Son Tin Box and Can Manufacturing Plant =

Historic building in Maryland, USA

- U.S. National Register of Historic Places
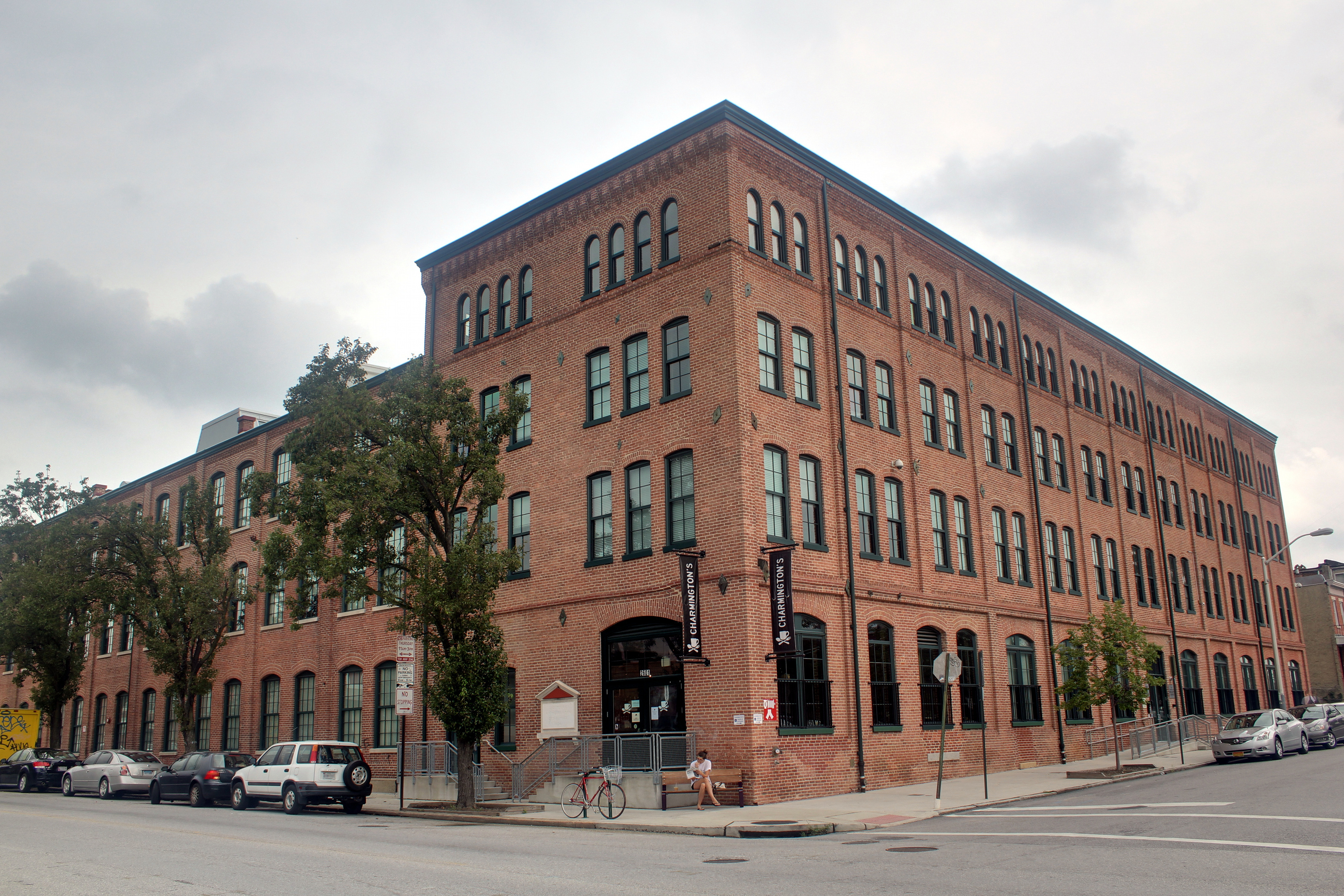
- H.F. Miller & Son Tin Box and Can Manufacturing Plant, September 2012

- Location within Baltimore Location within Maryland Location within the United States
- Location: 2601 N. Howard St., Baltimore, Maryland
- Coordinates: 39°19′10″N 76°37′12″W
- Area: 0.8 acres (0.32 ha)
- Built: 1890
- Architectural style: Early Commercial, Chicago
- NRHP reference No.: 03001268
- Added to NRHP: December 10, 2003

H.F. Miller & Son Tin Box and Can Manufacturing Plant, or the American Can Company, Miller Factory, and now Miller Court is a historic can manufacturing plant located at Baltimore, Maryland, United States. It was erected in three stages between 1890 and about 1910. It is a four-story brick manufacturing plant. The exterior features decorative brickwork, multiple window forms, and substantial construction typical of the period. The interior features chamfered posts, closely spaced joists, and fire doors.

The building has been redeveloped as Miller's Court with 40 apartments, as well as office and project space for public and charitable agencies. Apartments in the $20 million project were marketed to Baltimore public school teachers. The first tenants moved in during July 2009.

H.F. Miller & Son Tin Box and Can Manufacturing Plant was listed on the National Register of Historic Places in 2003.
