= 1989 visit by Boris Yeltsin to the United States =

- Part of Soviet Union–United States relations
- Date: September 9–17, 1989
- Location: United States (Note: Specific cities included New York City, Baltimore, Washington, D.C., Chicago, Philadelphia, Indianapolis, Minneapolis, Dallas, Houston, and Miami.)
- Organized by: Esalen Institute
- Participants: Boris Yeltsin

In September 1989, Boris Yeltsin, a politician who had recently been elected to the Supreme Soviet of the Soviet Union, visited the United States. During the trip, he visited ten cities and made numerous speeches and public appearances.

Following his electoral victories in the 1989 elections, multiple organizations and individuals had reached out to Yeltsin, who was widely seen as a leader of the political reform movement in the Soviet Union, regarding a visit to the United States. Ultimately, Yeltsin accepted an offer from the Esalen Institute that would see the Soviet politician visit multiple cities on a public speaking tour. The trip would be entirely funded via his speaking fees, and as part of the agreement, Yeltsin's share of the profits would be used to purchase disposable syringes to help combat HIV/AIDS in the Soviet Union.

The trip began on September 9 with a visit to New York City and continued over the next week, with notable highlights including a meeting with President George H. W. Bush at the White House and a meeting with former President Ronald Reagan in Minnesota. On September 16, following a tour of the Johnson Space Center in Houston, Yeltsin's entourage made an unexpected stop at a Randalls grocery store to see what the average American shopping experience was like. Multiple commentators have noted that the grocery store visit had a major impact on Yeltsin's political views, with an aide who had been present with him during the trip saying that "the last vestige of Bolshevism collapsed inside" of him following the trip. Upon his return to the Soviet Union, Yeltsin continued to advocate for political reform and for closer ties with the United States. In 1991, he was elected president of Russia and, in that position, helped lead the country away from a communist system and towards a democratic capitalist one. In 2020, a comic opera of Yeltsin's visit to the Houston area grocery market, titled Yeltsin in Texas, premiered.

== Background ==
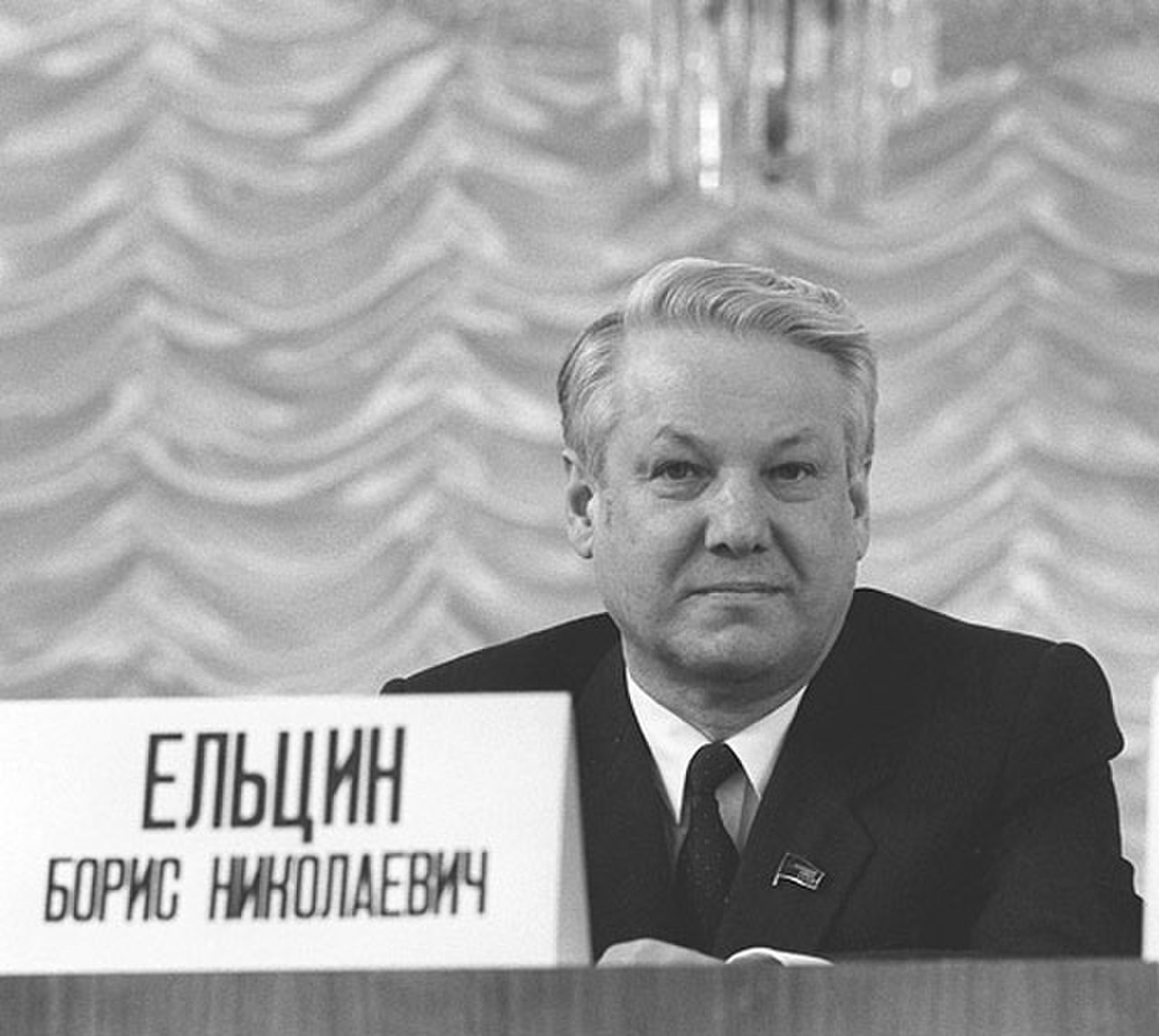
Boris Yeltsin in February 1989

Boris Yeltsin was a politician in the Soviet Union who, in the 1989 Soviet Union legislative election that March, won a landslide victory in his election to the Congress of People's Deputies, receiving about 92 percent of the vote in his Moscow district. In doing so, he soundly defeated a candidate who had been favored by the local chapter of the Communist Party. Later that year, this body elected him to a seat on the Supreme Soviet. During his time in the legislature, he cofounded the Inter-regional Deputies Group, a Parliamentary opposition group that focused on government reform. He served as a co-chairman for the group. According to United Press International (UPI), Yeltsin was seen as a "national symbol of reform", while Felicity Barringer of The New York Times called him "the symbol of growing political pluralism in Moscow". UPI further called him the second most popular person in the country, behind only General Secretary Mikhail Gorbachev.

Following his first election, Yeltsin began to receive invitations from several groups and individuals in the United States, including United States senators, the Council on Foreign Relations, the Ford Foundation, the Rockefeller Foundation, and several universities, requesting for him to make appearances. In total, he received 15 different invitations in 1989, though Yeltsin remained hesitant to visit. Some of his aides reached out to Soviet activist Gennady Alferenko about a potential visit to the United States, and Alferenko talked to Jim Garrison, the executive director of the Soviet–American Exchange Program of the Esalen Institute. Esalen, a New Age group based in California, had established the program in 1980 in order to foster better relations between Soviets and Americans. The program usually involved people from the two countries meeting in a casual setting at Esalen's facility in California, with some in the media referring to the program's citizen diplomacy as "hot tub diplomacy". Garrison and Alferenko met with Yeltsin in Moscow to discuss the trip, with Yeltsin ultimately agreeing. The Foundation for Social Inventions also supported Yeltsin's trip, which would be his first to the United States.

Esalen's plan for Yeltsin did not involve a trip to their California facility, but instead consisted of a multi-day tour of the United States that included numerous speaking appearances for the Soviet politician. These cities would include New York City, Baltimore, Washington, D.C., Chicago, Philadelphia, Indianapolis, Minneapolis, Dallas, and Miami. Additionally, the trip would include a stop in Houston to see the Johnson Space Center. Esalen would pay for the trip through the collection of speaking fees, ranging from $5,000 to $25,000 per appearance (equivalent to between $13,000 and $65,000 in 2025). Thirty percent of the money raised would go towards the booking agency that planned the events, while the remainder would go to Yeltsin. Yeltsin was at first opposed to the commercial nature of the tour but eventually agreed to it as a way to self-finance the trip. However, he only agreed to participate on the stipulation that his entire share of the profits be spent on disposable syringes for Soviet hospitals. Earlier in the year, nine children in the Soviet city of Elista had contracted HIV due to faulty medical equipment, and the syringes were intended to help combat the further spread of HIV/AIDS in the Soviet Union. In addition to his share of the profits, Yeltsin was also guaranteed a $100 per diem ($260 in 2025).

Yeltsin publicly announced his trip at a press conference on September 5. He said that, while the acquisition of medical supplies had been a secondary goal of his trip, his main goal was to learn more about the United States. (Note: In a later conversation with United States National Security Advisor Brent Scowcroft, Yeltsin told him that his trip was more for "philosophical" than political reasons and that he wanted to see this "great country and get acquainted with its hard-working people".) Commenting on his perceived differences between the United States and Soviet Union, The New York Times quoted him as saying, "You have more than 200 years' experience in democratic government, although bourgeois democracy. We're just getting out of the egg". UPI also said that his lectures would focus on the Soviet system of government, calling the theme of his lectures "Frontiers of Soviet Democracy". Yeltsin also hoped to use the trip as a platform to advocate for continued economic and political reform in the Soviet Union, such as with Gorbachev's glasnost and perestroika programs. Yeltsin also planned to visit several AIDS clinics, including the Memorial Sloan Kettering Cancer Center in New York City. Accompanying Yeltsin on his trip would be Viktor Yaroshenko (a member of the Congress of People's Deputies), Lev Sukhanov (a personal assistant to Yeltsin), Viktor Alferenko (the chairman of the Foundation for Social Inventions), Pavel Voshchanov (a colleague of Alferenko and columnist for the newspaper Pravda), Garrison, an assistant for Garrison, and two translators. While the trip was initially planned to run from September 9 to 23, it was shortened by a few days to allow Yeltsin to attend an important meeting of the Central Committee in Moscow. As a result, he would return by September 17. According to Garrison, the Ministry of Foreign Affairs did not grant Yeltsin an exit visa until the night of September 7, casting some doubt that the trip would occur.

== Visit ==
=== New York City ===
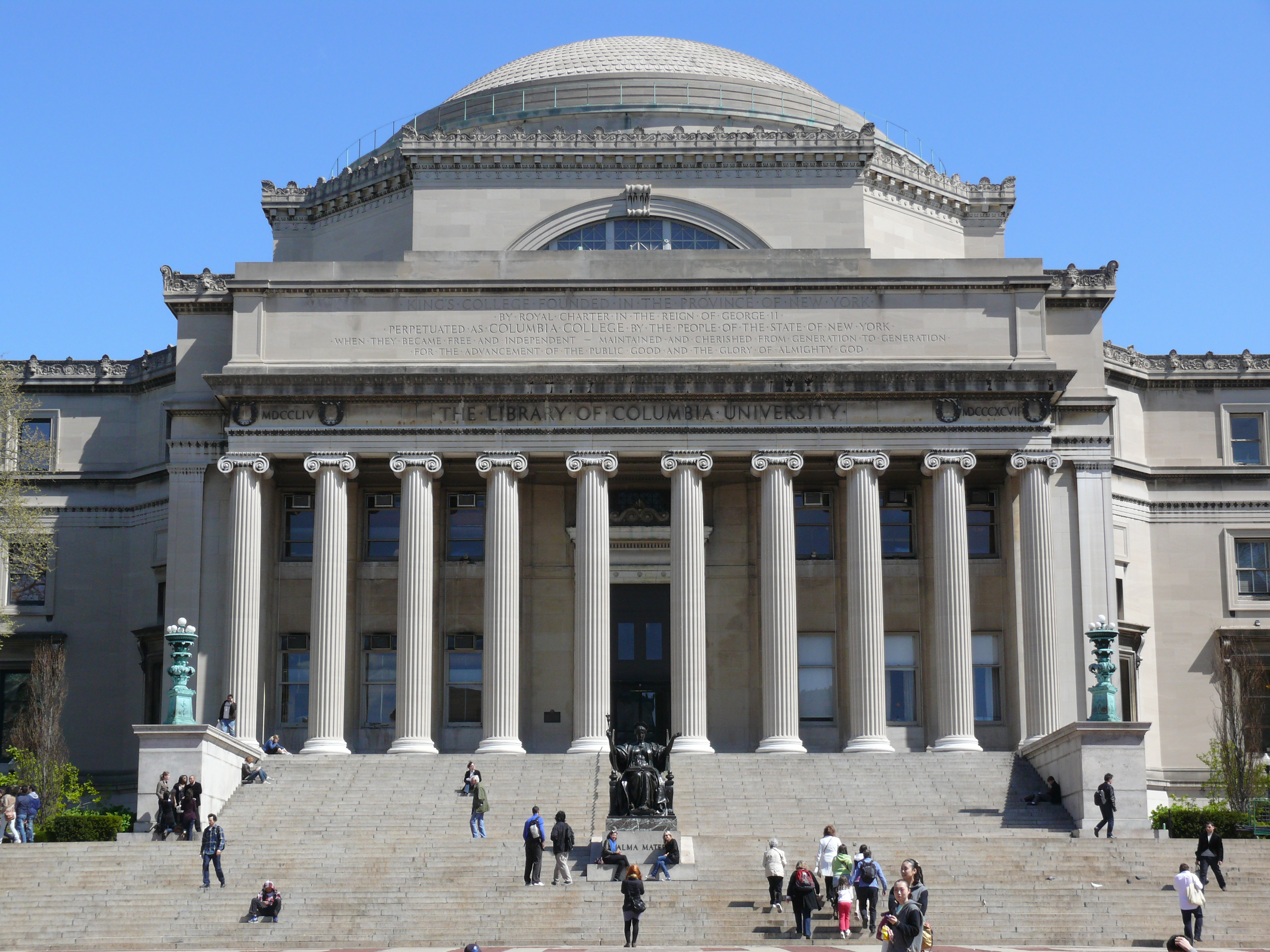
Yeltsin's first public speaking engagement occurred at the Low Memorial Library at Columbia University (pictured 2012).

Yeltsin flew to the United States on September 9, arriving at John F. Kennedy International Airport in New York City, where he spoke to a group of reporters at the Worldport. During his first morning in the city, he took a helicopter tour to see the Statue of Liberty. This was followed by a day and a half of interviews and further sightseeing, visiting such tourist attractions as Central Park, the Empire State Building, Fifth Avenue, the Metropolitan Museum of Art, and Trump Tower. Plans to visit Bloomingdale's flagship store in Manhattan were cancelled due to time considerations. At 7:15 a.m. on September 10, Yeltsin was interviewed by Good Morning America on ABC, after which he visited the New York Stock Exchange. Later interviews included ones with Nightline on ABC, Face the Nation on CBS, and The MacNeil/Lehrer NewsHour on PBS. At noon, Yeltsin attended a meeting of officials of the Council on Foreign Relations, including George F. Kennan and Cyrus Vance, where he was introduced by David Rockefeller. His first large-scale public speaking engagement was later that day at Columbia University. The speech had been arranged by Professor Robert Legvold and took place in the Low Memorial Library, with Columbia University President Michael I. Sovern introducing him. That evening, he attended a dinner at the River Club hosted by Rockefeller, and shortly before midnight, he boarded a plane to Baltimore.

=== Baltimore ===
Originally, Yeltsin had planned to arrive in Baltimore by 10 p.m. on September 12. However, he did not arrive at Baltimore/Washington International Airport until 1 a.m. the next day, and he was described by those around him as extremely tired. Yeltsin was scheduled to participate in a speech at 7:45 a.m., though he and his entourage did not begin to go to sleep until about 4 a.m., after a late meal. Yeltsin himself, however, had trouble going to sleep and only went to bed after consuming two shots of whiskey and two sleeping pills. In total, he only slept for about two hours that night before waking for his meeting at the Johns Hopkins Club. Yeltsin's speech was delayed by over an hour before he was able to deliver it. Steven Muller, president of Johns Hopkins University, called the meeting that he organized "at best an unmitigated disaster". While colleagues of his defended his behavior and said he was not drunk during the engagement, (Note: In later comments, Garrison stated that Yeltsin had been drunk constantly throughout the trip, but that he had kept this information hidden from the public.) it was reported in several sources, including The New York Times, that he had been drinking heavily and was visibly intoxicated. Following his speech, he departed Baltimore for Washington, D.C., though not before receiving a medal from Baltimore Mayor Kurt Schmoke for participating in a city-coordinated literacy program.

=== Washington, D.C. ===
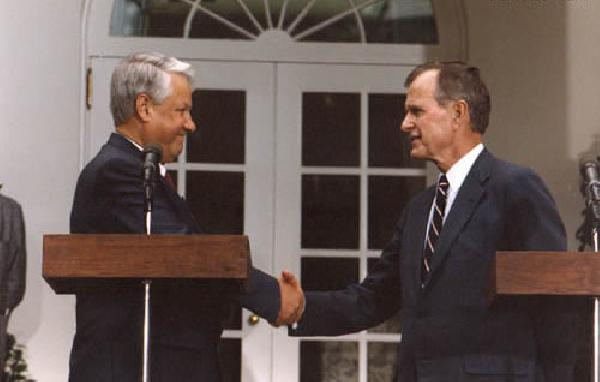
Yeltsin met with President George H. W. Bush (right) at the White House on September 11, 1989 (picture of a later meeting in 1991).

Prior to departing to the United States, Yeltsin had expressed interest in speaking to George H. W. Bush, the president of the United States, though by early September, nothing solid had been established regarding this meeting. However, while in Baltimore, Yeltsin received news that, on September 11, he would be received at the White House. Because the Bush administration did not want Yeltsin's White House visit to be perceived as a slight towards Gorbachev, who had never visited the White House, they decided that, officially, Yeltsin would be received by National Security Advisor Brent Scowcroft, but that Bush would be present as well. Additionally, no members of the media would be present. Yeltsin was not made aware of this arrangement until he arrived at the White House. In total, Yeltsin only had a brief interaction with Bush, who was preparing for a speech at the time, and much of the information that Yeltsin had wished to talk to Bush about was instead delivered to Scowcroft. While at the White House, Yeltsin also met with presidential advisor Condoleezza Rice and Vice President Dan Quayle. Because of the White House visit, Yeltsin was forced to cancel several other engagements he had had planned in Washington, including a meeting with a group of politicians that included Zbigniew Brzezinski, Dick Gephardt, and Barbara Mikulski. The only appointment that he was able to keep was with a group of several senators that had been organized by Bill Bradley. One of the last people he met with while at the United States Capitol was Secretary of State James Baker.

=== Activity in other cities ===
On September 12, Yeltsin visited Philadelphia, where he saw the Liberty Bell. While in Indiana, Yeltsin visited a pig farm, and when asked by a farmer if he wanted to see pigs, Yeltsin jokingly replied, "Generally, I prefer to see Americans, but, I guess, pigs would do." On September 14, while visiting Minneapolis, Yeltsin traveled to Rochester, Minnesota, to see former President Ronald Reagan, who was recuperating from surgery at the Mayo Clinic Hospital. Yeltsin said he hoped to meet with Reagan because he respected the former president for his role in improving Soviet–American relations.

=== Grocery store visit in Houston ===
While in Texas, Yeltsin gave a speech in Dallas, and on September 16, he traveled to Houston to visit the Johnson Space Center. While there, his entourage was given a private tour of the facility and shown the Christopher C. Kraft Jr. Mission Control Center and a mockup of a planned space station that NASA was working on. Part of the reason for the visit was so that Yeltsin, who had campaigned in part on reducing funding for the Soviet space program, could see the possibilities of what further funding for aeronautics research could lead to. Yeltsin had a background in engineering and asked many questions regarding construction and design during the tour. Following the tour, Yeltsin and his group departed the facility and began driving to the airport.

While on the way to the airport, Yeltsin decided to take an unannounced visit to a grocery store. Yeltsin said that he wanted to visit a typical store in order to see what the average American shopping experience was like. The group decided to visit Randalls #30 at 570 El Dorado Boulevard, near the intersection with State Highway 3, in Webster. The store manager received a phone call from the group shortly before their arrival, and he was given about 15 minutes to prepare. The visit was a low-key event, without heavy security or media presence, with the exception of reporter Stefanie Asin of the Houston Chronicle. Yeltsin arrived at the store around 1:30 p.m. During his visit, Yeltsin inspected the product selection in the store and tried free samples of cheese and produce. According to the manager on duty at the time, Yeltsin was very interested in the frozen food section, and a picture of Yeltsin looking at a selection of Pudding Pops was widely republished. He was astonished by the selection available in the store, which he was told offered about 30,000 unique products, and expressed disbelief that such a store was available to residents outside of major urban areas like New York City. He also asked the store manager if he had required specialized training to earn his position. Speaking through an interpreter, Yeltsin talked to employees and customers, asking them questions about how much they spent on groceries compared to what their salary was. In total, the trip lasted about 20 minutes, with Yeltsin receiving a goodie bag from the store staff before leaving.

Following the grocery store visit, Yeltsin and his entourage flew to Miami, their final location before returning to the Soviet Union. During the flight, Yeltsin was in a state of shock regarding the grocery store and remained speechless for a long time. According to Sukhanov, it was during the flight that "the last vestige of Bolshevism collapsed inside" Yeltsin. Following his silence, Yeltsin asked aloud, "What have they done to our people?", questioning the Soviet Union's struggles with food. In a later biography, Yeltsin commented regarding his grocery store visit,

When I saw those shelves crammed with hundreds, thousands of cans, cartons and goods of every possible sort, for the first time I felt quite frankly sick with despair for the Soviet people. That such a potentially super-rich country as ours has been brought to a state of such poverty! It is terrible to think of it.

Yeltsin commented that if people in the Soviet Union were aware of the quality of the average American grocery store, "there would be a revolution", further saying that "Even the Politburo doesn't have this choice. Not even Mr. Gorbachev."

== Aftermath ==
The trip had been widely covered by almost every major American news publication and program, and he had been relatively well received at his events, which included numerous standing ovations. Concerning the significance of Yeltsin's trip, Lester Thurow of the MIT Sloan School of Management said, "It's a revolution. He's really the leader of the political opposition in Moscow, and to think that the leadership would let him visit the United States - well, there would have been no way on God's green earth that could have happened 10 years ago." After returning to the Soviet Union, the Esalen Institute held a press conference showing a large collection of disposable syringes that they were shipping to the Soviet Union, per the terms of Yeltsin's agreement with the group. In later years, Yeltsin would similarly use the profits he received from a speaking tour of Japan to buy more syringes, as well as the profits from an autobiography he wrote. Regarding his per diem, he used the funds to purchase a computer for his office and gifts for his children and grandchildren.

=== Impact on Yeltsin's views ===
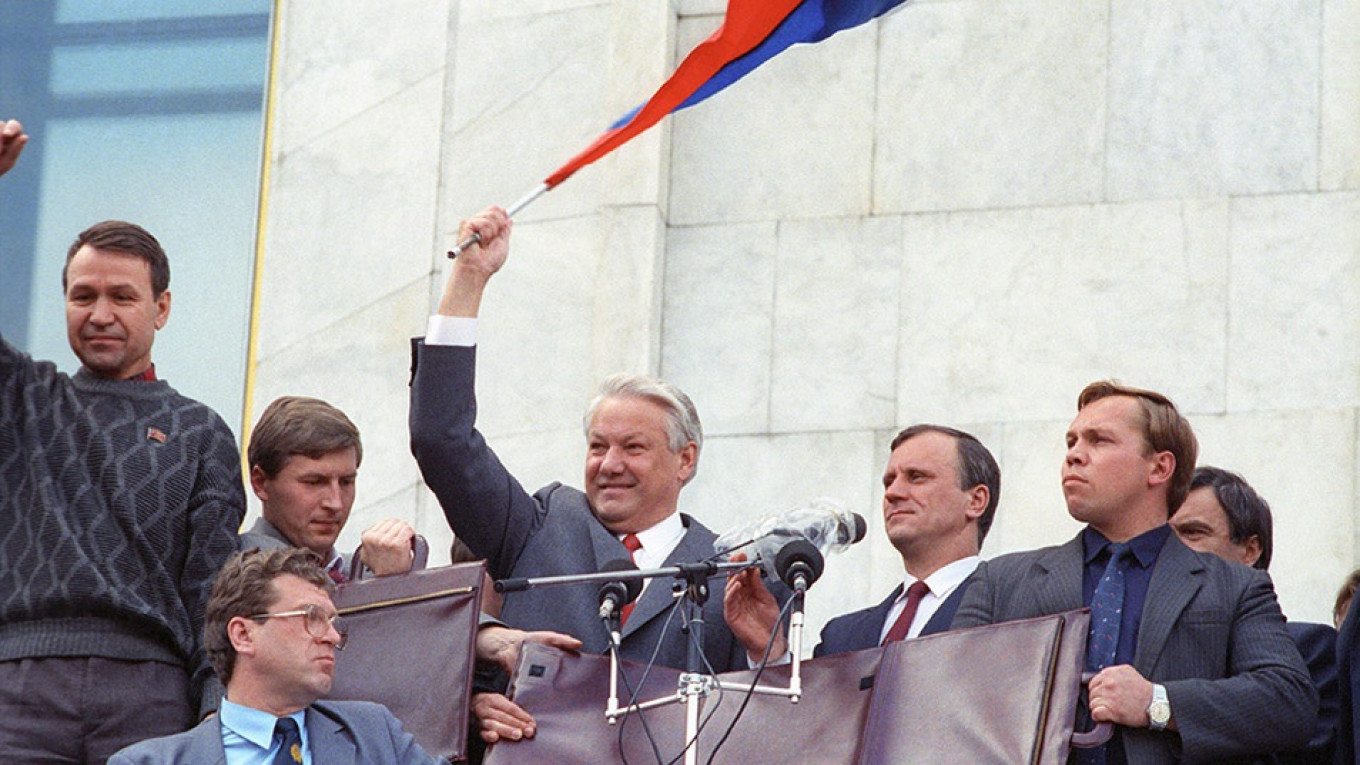
Yeltsin waving a Russian flag in 1991

Following his trip, Yeltsin stated that his views of the United States had "turned around 180 degrees". In a later biography, his biographer, Leon Aron, noted that there had been four major political takeaways that Yeltsin had had in the United States. These included the importance of having a peaceful coexistence between the majority government and minority government in the legislature, the protection of civil liberties, the direct election of the president, and antitrust laws that prevented the development of monopolies. Regarding New York City, he said that his impression of the city was not what he had expected based on the Soviet propaganda that he had consumed, commenting that the people were respectful and the architecture of the city was impressive. Concerning a public housing project near the East River, he compared them to Khrushchevkas built during the 1960s and said that "some slums [in New York City] would pass for decent housing in the Soviet Union". However, multiple commentators have stated that his grocery store visit in Texas had proven to be the most impactful part of his visit, with Aron saying that his experience there was "unequal in its impact".

Multiple commentators have noted that the trip damaged Yeltsin's support for the communist system then in place in his home country, (Note: This topic was the subject of numerous conservative and libertarian organizations and commentators, such as the Cato Institute and the Texas Public Policy Foundation, in the 2010s and 2020s.) with journalist Marilyn Berger saying in 2007 that, following the grocery store trip, Yeltsin "became more convinced than ever that Russia had been ruinously damaged by its centralized, state-run economic system, where people stood in long lines to buy the most basic needs of life and more often than not found the shelves bare". Back in the Soviet Union, Yeltsin became much more supportive of improving relations with the United States. In December, he became the leader of the democratic opposition to Gorbachev, whom he criticized due to the slow pace of reforms in the country. In 1991, he left the Communist Party and became the first president of Russia. In June 1991, while president-elect, he again visited the United States. As president, he helped to lead the country from a one-party communist state to a democratic capitalist nation. Voshchanov, who had accompanied Yeltsin during his 1989 trip, became his first press secretary. Yeltsin died in 2007. By 2017, the Randalls that he had visited had closed. It was replaced by a Lewis Food Town location, though this store had also closed by 2025. In 2020, a comic opera that showed a comedic retelling of Yeltsin's visit to the grocery store called Yeltsin in Texas was produced and performed in the Houston area.

== See also ==
- Foreign relations of the Soviet Union
- Foreign relations of the United States

== Sources ==
- Aikman, David (September 2, 1991). "Rising Star: The Man Who Rules Russia". Time. Time Warner. ISSN 0040-781X. OCLC 1311479. Archived from the original on January 16, 2025.
- Altman, Lawrence K. (September 15, 1989). "Reagan to Leave Hospital Today". The New York Times. p. 16. ISSN 0362-4331. OCLC 1645522. Archived from the original on December 19, 2017.
- Aron, Leon (2000). Yeltsin: A Revolutionary Life (First U.S. ed.). New York City: St. Martin's Press. ISBN 978-0-312-25185-7. OCLC 43167897.
- Barringer, Felicity (September 9, 1989a). "Yeltsin, Soviet Opposition Figure, Is Due Today for U.S. Tour". The New York Times. p. 4. ISSN 0362-4331. OCLC 1645522. Archived from the original on December 20, 2017.
- Barringer, Felicity (September 13, 1989b). "Smiling Soviet Visitor Meets Bush And Proves Deft in Capital's Ways". The New York Times. p. 6. ISSN 0362-4331. OCLC 1645522. Archived from the original on December 20, 2017.
- Berger, Marilyn (April 23, 2007). "Boris Yeltsin, Russia's First Post-Soviet Leader, Is Dead". The New York Times. ISSN 0362-4331. OCLC 1645522. Archived from the original on April 4, 2024.
- Bohlen, Celestine (September 11, 1989). "Yeltsin, the Moscow Populist, Takes Manhattan (in Stride)". The New York Times. p. 1. ISSN 0362-4331. OCLC 1645522. Archived from the original on April 19, 2022.
- Combs, Dick (2008). Inside the Soviet Alternate History: The Cold War's End and the Soviet Union's Fall Reappraised. Foreword by Jack F. Matlock Jr. University Park, Pennsylvania: Pennsylvania State University Press. ISBN 978-0-271-03355-6. OCLC 231680061.
- David, Jamil (January 13, 2025). "Food Town closes location of former Randall's visited by Boris Yeltsin". Chron.com. Hearst Communications.
- Dobbs, Michael (1997) [1996]. Down with Big Brother: The Fall of the Soviet Empire. London: Bloomsbury Publishing. ISBN 978-1-4088-5102-9. OCLC 893298079.
- Gill, Julian (February 26, 2019a). "The weirdest things that have ever happened in Houston". Chron.com. Hearst Communications.
- Gill, Julian (February 27, 2019b). "The strangest things that have happened in Houston". Chron.com. Hearst Communications.
- Gray, Chris (January 30, 2020). "New Opera Tells Story Of Russian Politician Boris Yeltsin's 1989 Trip to Randalls". Houstonia. Archived from the original on September 17, 2024.
- Groover, D. L. (February 23, 2020). "A Good Cast Works Hard in Yeltsin in Texas". Houston Press. Archived from the original on December 23, 2021.
- Hagerty, Michael (February 19, 2020a). "5 Vanished, Lesser-Known Houston Landmarks". Houston Public Media. University of Houston. Archived from the original on July 10, 2024.
- Hagerty, Michael (February 21, 2020b). "Boris Yeltsin's 1989 Visit to a Houston Grocery Store Is Now an Opera". Houston Public Media. University of Houston. Archived from the original on December 29, 2024.
- Hlavaty, Craig (April 7, 2014). "Boris Yeltsin in Houston". Chron.com. Hearst Communications.
- Hlavaty, Craig (January 31, 2018a) [September 13, 2017]. "When Boris Yeltsin went grocery shopping in Clear Lake". Chron.com. Hearst Communications.
- Hlavaty, Craig (October 14, 2018b). "Houston's famous (and infamous) visitors over the decades". Chron.com. Hearst Communications.
- Howe, Marvine (September 10, 1989). "Opposition Leader From Soviet Union Begins Visit to U.S.". The New York Times. p. 17. ISSN 0362-4331. OCLC 1645522. Archived from the original on December 20, 2017.
- Jordan, Jay R. (August 9, 2019). "Russian president's communism-shattering visit to Clear Lake grocery store showcased in new opera". Chron.com. Hearst Communications.
- Keller, Bill (October 17, 1989). "Yeltsin Makes the News Again, but Ruefully". The New York Times. p. 13. ISSN 0362-4331. OCLC 1645522. Archived from the original on September 3, 2024.
- Kripal, Jeffrey J.; Shuck, Glenn W. (2005). "Introducing Esalen". In Kripal, Jeffrey J.; Shuck, Glenn W. (eds.). On the Edge of the Future: Esalen and the Evolution of American Culture. Bloomington, Indiana: Indiana University Press. pp. 1–16. ISBN 978-0-253-34556-1. OCLC 57069541.
- Kripal, Jeffrey J. (2007). Esalen: America and the Religion of No Religion. Chicago: University of Chicago Press. ISBN 978-0-226-45369-9. OCLC 71552179.
- Levitt, Aimee (February 25, 2020). "Boris Yeltsin's 1989 Visit to a Texas Supermarket Has Inspired an Opera". The Takeout. Static Media. Archived from the original on July 25, 2024.
- Lincicome, Scott (September 15, 2023). "Happy Yeltsin Supermarket Day!". Cato Institute. Archived from the original on December 1, 2024.
- Lovell, Stephen (2010). The Shadow of War: Russia and the USSR, 1941 to the present. Chichester: Wiley-Blackwell. ISBN 978-1-4443-5159-0. OCLC 567008056.
- Malcolm, Timothy (September 15, 2024). "How Boris Yeltsin's trip to a Houston-area Randall's changed the world". Chron.com. Hearst Communications.
- McDowell, Edwin (June 19, 1989). "Summit Books Signs A Moscow Maverick". The New York Times. p. 13. ISSN 0362-4331. OCLC 1645522. Archived from the original on April 2, 2024.
- Miller, Mark (August 21, 2018). "A socialist visits a Texas grocery store". The Hill. ISSN 1521-1568. OCLC 31153202. Archived from the original on December 7, 2024.
- Oliver, Dave; Toprani, Anand (2022). American Defense Reform: Lessons from Failure and Success in Navy History. Foreword by Bill Owens. Washington, D.C.: Georgetown University Press. ISBN 978-1-64712-276-8. OCLC 1289617597.
- Paulus, Daniel (November 1, 2024). "Remember Russian President Yeltsin's Eye-Opening Supermarket Visit In Houston". KLAQ. Archived from the original on November 3, 2024.
- Plokhy, Serhii (2014). The Last Empire: The Final Days of the Soviet Union (Updated ed.). New York City: Basic Books. ISBN 978-0-465-05696-5. OCLC 859186452.
- Roberts, Kevin (December 26, 2019). "Boris and Bernie Go Shopping". Texas Public Policy Foundation. Archived from the original on May 28, 2024.
- Sarotte, M. E. (2021). Not One Inch: America, Russia, and the Making of Post-Cold War Stalemate. New Haven, Connecticut: Yale University Press. ISBN 978-0-300-25993-3. OCLC 1283851139.
- "Coming To America". Time. September 25, 1989. ISSN 0040-781X. OCLC 1311479. Archived from the original on January 17, 2025.
- "Soviet reform politician to visit U.S." United Press International. September 5, 1989. Archived from the original on January 16, 2025.
- "Yeltsin flies to United States for visit". United Press International. September 9, 1989b. Archived from the original on December 21, 2019.
- "Photo: Boris Yeltsin on a 9 city tour of the United States". United Press International. September 12, 1989c. Archived from the original on January 17, 2025.
