= Mary Magdalene de' Pazzi =

Italian Carmelite mystic and saint

Saint Mary Magdalene de' Pazzi OCarm
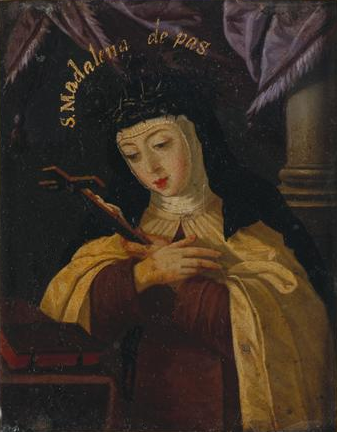
- 17th-century miniature by Josefa de Óbidos

Virgin
- Born: Caterina Lucrezia de' Pazzi; 2 April 1566; Florence
- Died: 25 May 1607 (aged 41); Florence
- Venerated in: Catholic Church
- Beatified: 1626, Rome by Pope Urban VIII
- Canonized: 28 April 1669, Rome by Pope Clement X
- Major shrine: Monastery of Santa Maria Maddalena de' Pazzi, Careggi, Florence
- Feast: 25 May (29 May from 1728 to 1969)

Mary Magdalene de' Pazzi, OCarm (Italian: Maria Maddalena de' Pazzi; born Caterina Lucrezia de' Pazzi; 2 April 1566 – 25 May 1607), was an Italian Carmelite nun and mystic. She has been declared a saint by the Catholic Church.

== Life ==
De' Pazzi was born at Florence, Italy, on 2 April 1566, to Camillo di Geri de' Pazzi, a member of one of the wealthiest and most distinguished noble families of Renaissance Florence, and Maria Buondelmonti. She was christened Caterina Lucrezia, but in the family, she was called by her second name, out of respect for her paternal grandmother, Lucrezia Mannucci.

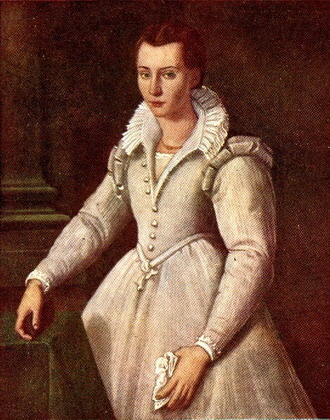
St. Mary Magdalene de' Pazzi at age 16 by Santi di Tito (1583)

At the age of nine, de' Pazzi was taught how to meditate by the family chaplain, using a contemporary work explaining how one should meditate on the Passion of Christ. Years later, this book was one of the items she brought with her to the monastery. Around the age of nine, she also began practicing mortification of the flesh through self-flagellation, wearing a barbed metal cilice, and wearing a home-made crown of thorns. She received her First Communion at the then-early age of 10 and made a vow of virginity the same year. She was in her mother's presence when she experienced her first ecstasy at the age of 12. From that point on, she continued to experience mystical experiences.

In 1580, at the age of fourteen, de' Pazzi was sent by her father to be educated at a monastery of nuns of the Order of Malta, but she was soon called home to marry a young nobleman. Caterina told her father of her vow to remain chaste, and he eventually relented and allowed her to enter monastic life instead of marrying. She chose to enter the Carmelite monastery of Santa Maria degli Angeli in Florence because the rule allowed her to receive Holy Communion daily. On 30 January 1583, she was accepted as a novice in that community, and she took the religious name of Sister Mary Magdalene.

== Mystic ==
De' Pazzi had been a novice for a year when she became critically ill. Upon receiving the religious habit, one of the sisters asked her how she could bear so much pain without a murmur. Mary pointed to the crucifix and said:

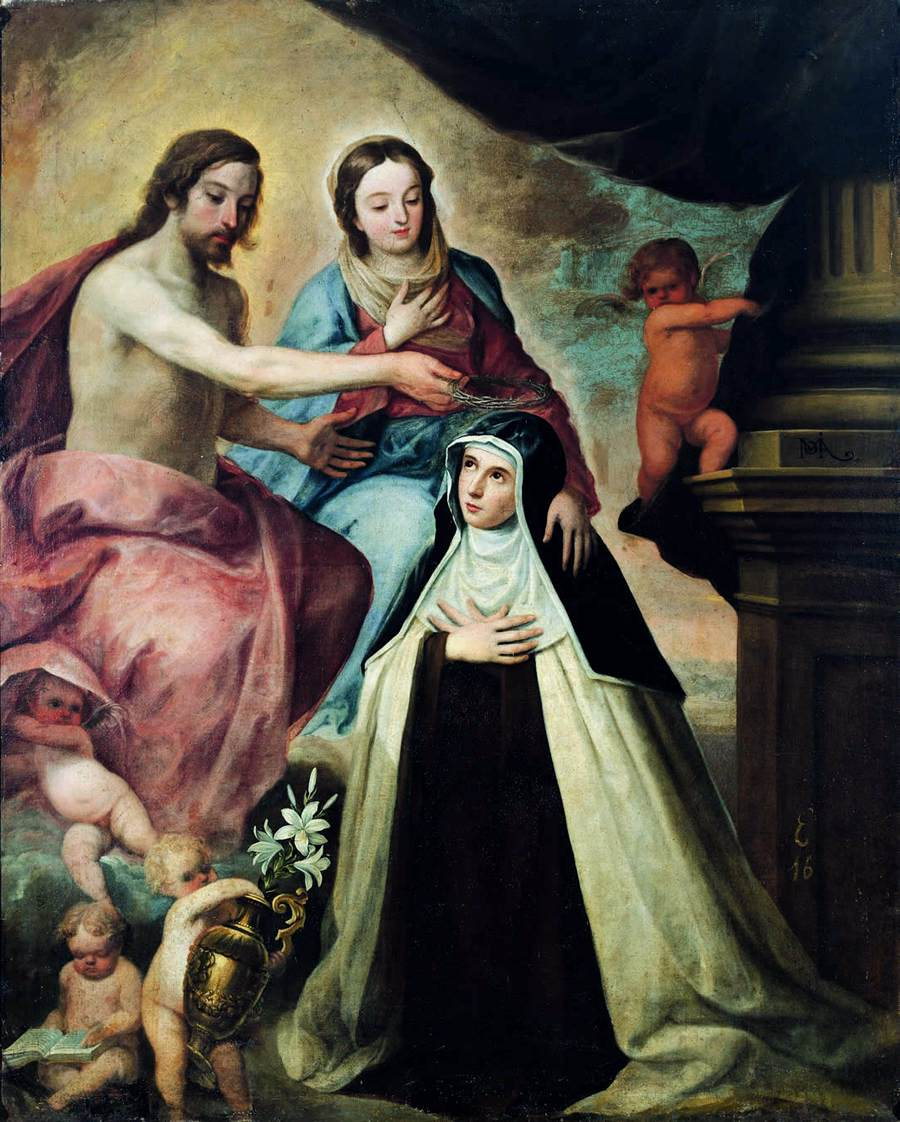
Vision of Saint Mary Magdalene de' Pazzi by Pedro de Moya (ca. 1640)

Those who call to mind the sufferings of Christ, and who offer up their own to God through His passion, find their pains sweet and pleasant.

Death seemed near, so her superiors let her make her profession of religious vows in a private ceremony, while lying on a cot in the chapel. Immediately after, she fell into an ecstasy that lasted about two hours. This was repeated on the following 40 mornings, each time after Communion.

As a safeguard against deception and to preserve the revelations, her confessor asked her to dictate her experiences to her fellow nuns. Over the next six years, five large volumes were filled with the record of her visions. The first three volumes record ecstasies from May 1584 through Pentecost week of the following year. That particular week was a preparation for a severe five-year trial. The fourth book records that trial, and the fifth is a collection of letters concerning reform and renewal. Another book, Admonitions, is a collection of her sayings arising from her experiences in the formation of women in religious orders.

It was believed that de' Pazzi could read the thoughts of others and predict future events. For instance, during one ecstatic event she predicted the future elevation to the papacy of Cardinal Alessandro de' Medici (as Pope Leo XI). During her lifetime, she allegedly appeared to several persons in distant places and cured a number of sick people.

De' Pazzi died on 25 May 1607, at the age of 41. She was buried in the choir of the monastery chapel. In 1668, in preparation for her canonization, her body was declared miraculously incorrupt. Her incorrupt body is located in the Monastery of Maria Maddalena de' Pazzi in Careggi.

== Veneration ==
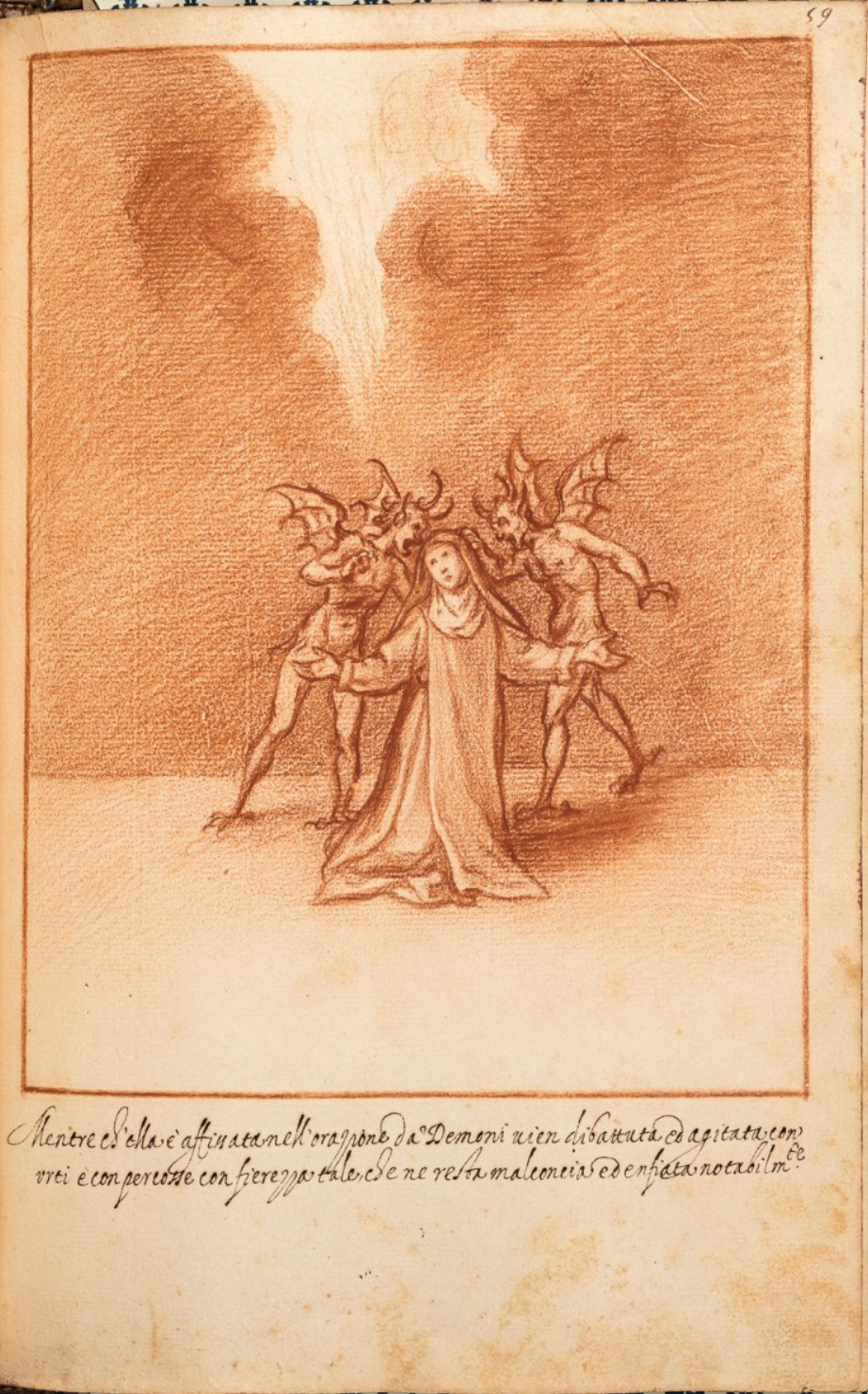
Mary Magdalene de' Pazzi beaten by demons while praying by Francesco Curradi (1606)

Two years after de' Pazzi died, the Jesuit Vincenzo Puccini, her confessor, published the life of this Carmelite nun as an edifying example. The 1639 edition was augmented with material relating to the mystic's canonization, and was purposefully dedicated to two nieces of Pope Urban VIII.

Numerous miracles allegedly followed de' Pazzi's death, and the process for her beatification was begun in the year 1610 under Pope Paul V, and completed under Pope Urban VIII in the year 1626. She was not, however, canonized until 62 years after her death, when Pope Clement IX raised her to the altars on 28 April 1669. The church of the Monastery of Pažaislis, commissioned in 1662 in Lithuania, was one of the first to be consecrated in her honor. Puccini's successful biography first was translated into French in honor of her canonization.

Nowadays, de' Pazzi herself is little known outside Italy, but her cult is very strong, especially in Florence. Paulist Press issued a selection of her writings in English translation in their series of Classics of Western Spirituality. Her importance in the Mission to the East especially in connection with India is recently explored.

== Feast day ==
In 1670, the year after de' Pazzi's canonization, the feast day of the saint was inserted in the General Roman Calendar for celebration on 25 May, the day of her death. In 1728, the date of 25 May was assigned instead to Pope Gregory VII, and her feast day was moved to 29 May, where it remained until 1969, when it was restored to its original place in the calendar, as the true anniversary of her death.

== Mortification ==
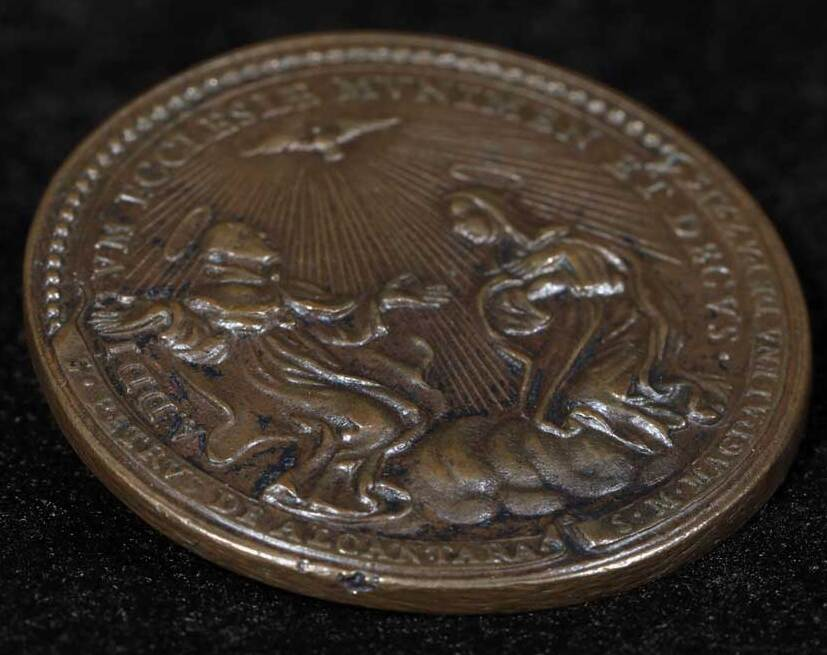
Medal commemorating the simultaneous canonization of Maria Maddalena de' Pazzi and her fellow mystic Pedro de Alcántara, 1669 (from the Women of the Book Collection, nr. 7595989, Sheridan Libraries, Johns Hopkins University.

De' Pazzi was known to practice mortification, such as scourging herself with a crown of thorns.

According to Asti Hustvedt, Pazzi "wore a crown of thorns and a corset onto which she had attached piercing nails. She also walked barefoot through the snow, dripped hot wax onto her body, and licked the wounds of the diseased, including those afflicted with leprosy." The anthropologist Eric Dingwall wrote a chapter on Pazzi and her flagellant behaviors in his book Very Peculiar People (1962). Psychiatrist Armando Favazza wrote in his book Bodies Under Siege (3rd edition, 2011):

At about age 37, emaciated and racked with coughing and pain, she took to her bed until she died four years later. Her painful gums were so badly infected that her teeth fell out, one by one. Her body was covered with putrefying bed sores, but when the sisters offered to move her she warned them off for fear that by touching her body they might experience sexual desires ... A large statue of her holding a flagellant whip can be seen in her church in Florence, where people around the world still come to pay her tribute.

== See also ==
- Book of the First Monks
- Carmelite Rule of St. Albert
