= Bibliotheca Fictiva Collection =

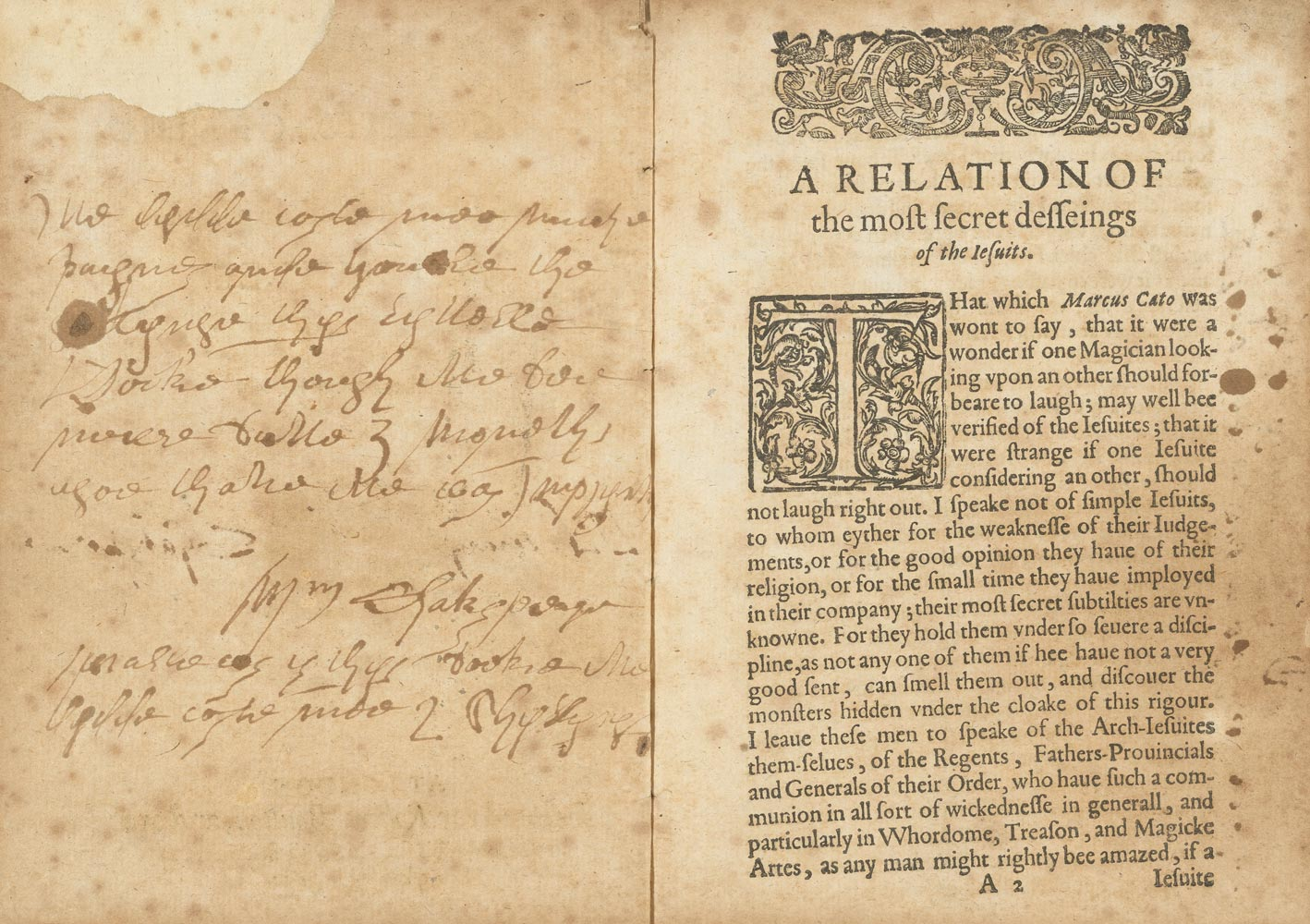
"Shakespeare" reads about a Jesuit plot to kill the King! From the Bibliotheca Fictiva Collection, nr. 4200972

The Bibliotheca Fictiva Collection of Literary and Historical Forgery is the premier library collection in the world that is dedicated entirely to the subject of textual fakery and imposture. The collection totals nearly two thousand rare books and manuscripts and is kept at the Special Collections Department of Johns Hopkins University’s The Sheridan Libraries.

== History of the collection ==
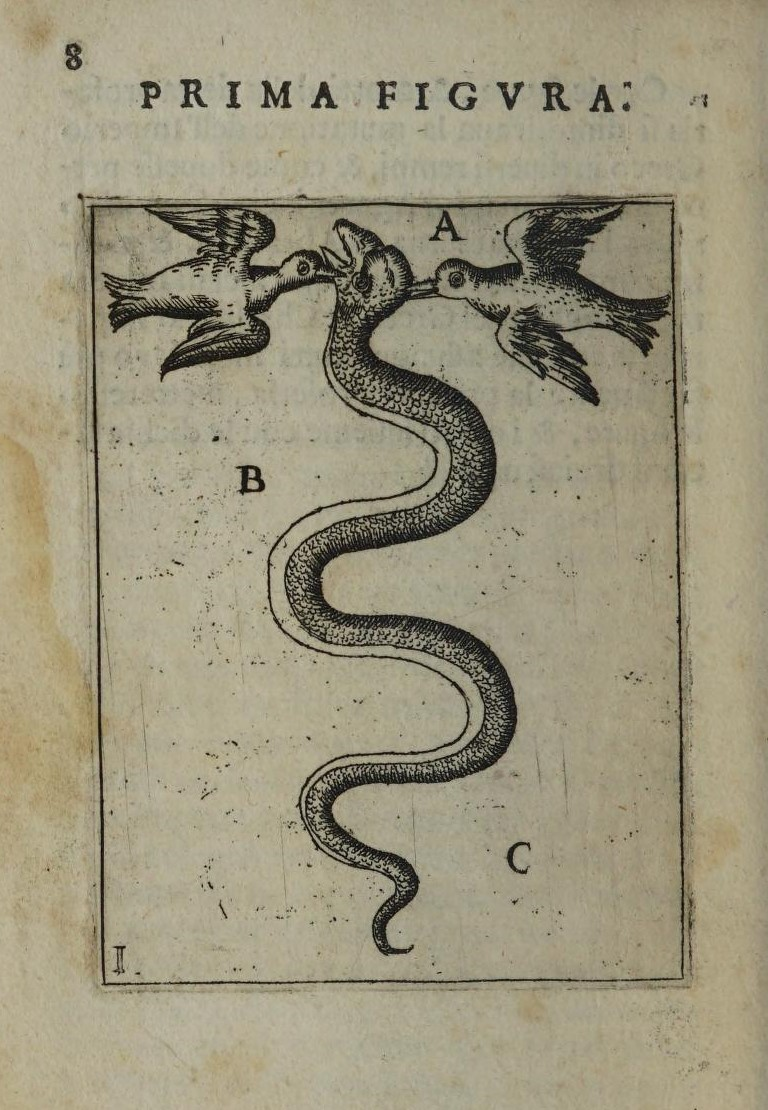
The Oracles of Leo the Wise and the Fall of the Turks, 1596 (from the Bibliotheca Fictiva Collection, nr. 8862176)

The collection has been built up over more than a half-century by the antiquarian booksellers, collectors, and book historians Arthur and Janet Freeman. The first items were acquired by Johns Hopkins in 2011, and hundreds of additional accessions have enriched the collection ever since.

== Scope ==
The Bibliotheca Fictiva collection spans the entire Western tradition from classical and biblical antiquity to the early-to-mid-twentieth centuries and contains both literary forgeries, and credulous defenses or popular demolition of them. Arthur and Janet Freeman collected works in “the entire range of literary forgery, that is to say the forgery of texts, whether historical, religious, philological, or ‘creatively’ artistic, in all languages and countries of the civilized Western world, from c. 400 BC to the end of the twentieth century” and “sought the original publications of such spuria, and their first and ongoing exposures (or obstinate endorsements), in whatever printed editions seemed most significant (along with manuscripts and correspondence when applicable), with a special emphasis […] on evocative annotated and association copies.” Although they “admitted specimens of the more conventional physical forgeries—faked printings, falsified provenance and ‘autograph’ annotation, etc.”, their main interest lay “in the deceptive creation of spurious text and fictive record, and the history of its investigation and discredit, or indeed its survival in present-day controversy.”

== Chronology ==
=== Forgeries from antiquity and the Middle Ages ===
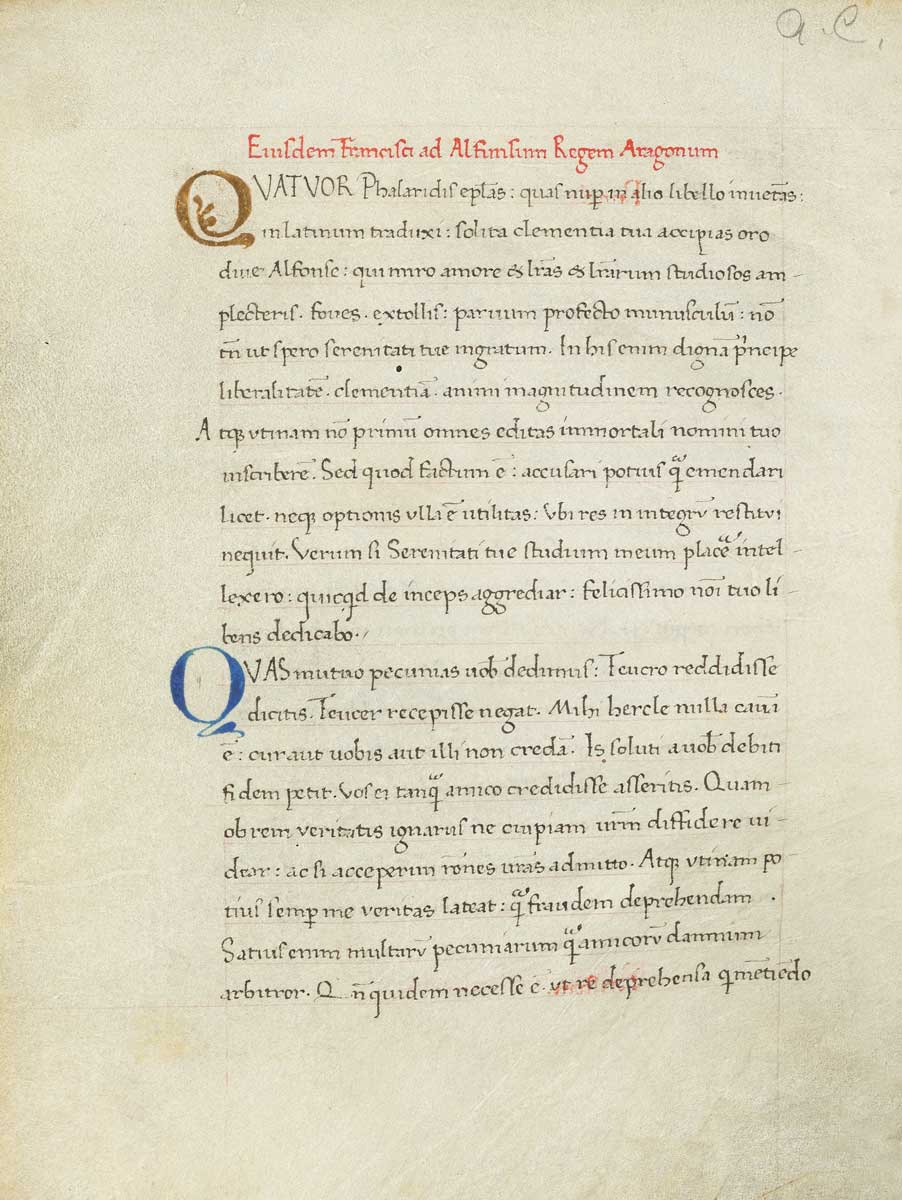
Real Renaissance Latin Translations of Newly Discovered Fake Ancient Greek Phalaris Letters (from the Bibliotheca Fictiva Collection, nr. 7535810)

From the first ancient Greek “travel liars,” to the faked epistles of pseudo-Aristeas and Phalaris, fabricated “eye-witness” accounts of the Fall of Troy, and invented epigraphic inscriptions from ancient ruins that never existed, onwards to small oceans of extra-biblical pseudepigrapha, classical and biblical antiquity are amply represented in the Bibliotheca Fictiva collection. Medieval “monkish” forgeries extend to faked patristic homilies and pastoral letters, false ecclesiastical decretals, and invented acts of early Christian councils. The collection contains faked polemics against “Pope Joan” (and their early modern demolition by both Catholic and Protestant critics) and the imaginative, if also often imaginary, chronicles of Asser, Geoffrey of Monmouth, and Godfrey of Viterbo.

=== Renaissance, Baroque and Enlightment forgeries ===
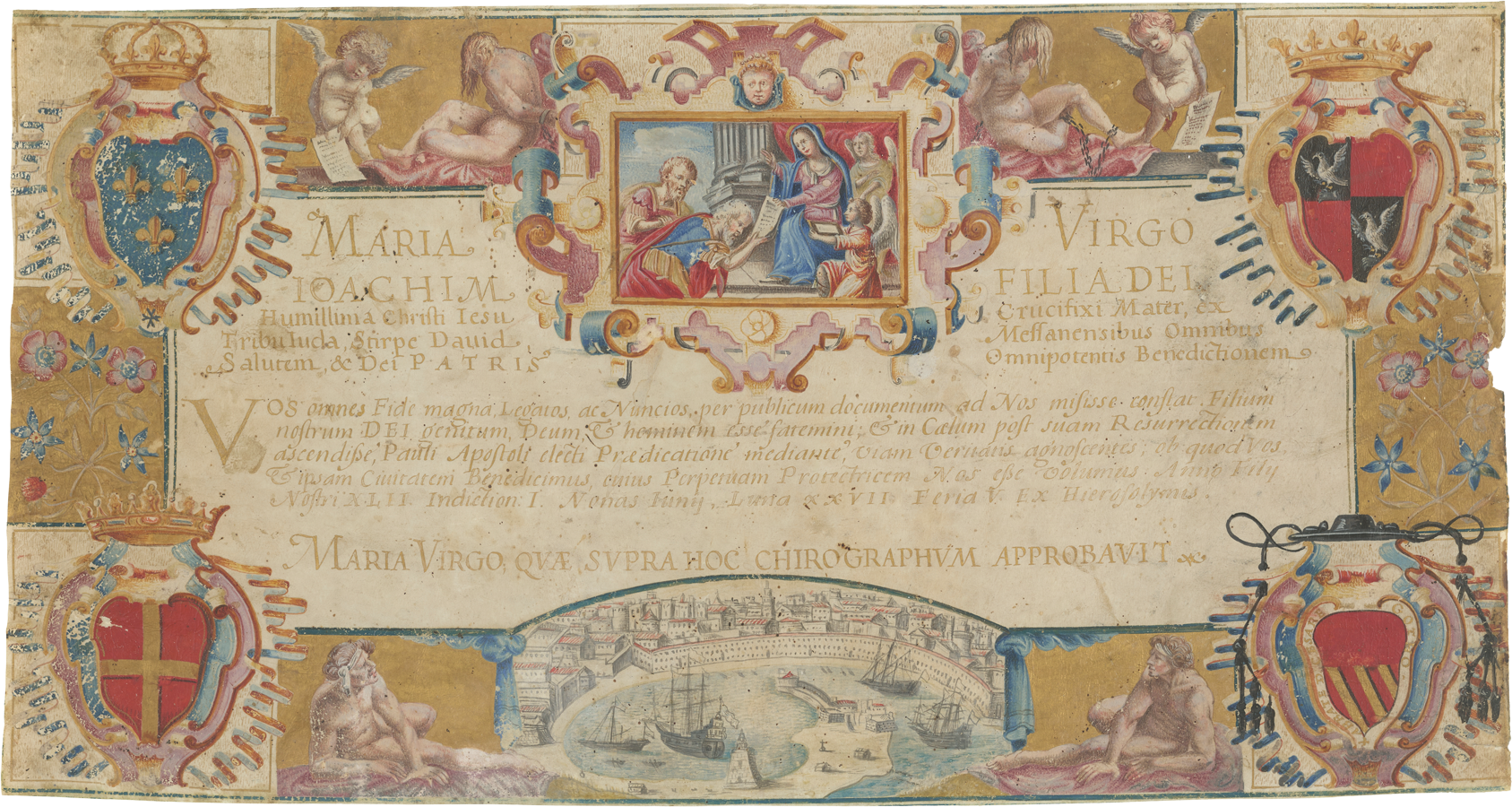
The Virgin Mary’s Fake Sicilian Letter, c. 1674-78 (from the Bibliotheca Fictiva Collection, nr. 8699204)

The renewed rigor of Renaissance classical scholarship and textual criticism was accompanied by equally ambitious efforts to pour new wine into old bottles, from the “archforger” Annius of Viterbo’s “newly discovered” but impossibly ancient world histories, to Carlo Sigonio’s “lost” Ciceronian treatise on death, and Curzio Inghirami’s scarith “time capusules” claiming to reveal the lost lore and prophecies of the last Etruscans. The Baroque and Enlightenment eras proved to be just as fertile for forgery, including devastating demolitions of several of the most enduring ancient forgeries (e.g., the ‘Donatio Constantini,’ ‘Corpus Hermeticum,’ and the Sibylline Books) and imaginative concoctions of others, including an Elizabethan invention of Anglo-Saxon laws as precedents for contemporary trade protectionism, and the runic “facsimile” of the fake Icelandic “Hjalmar” saga.

Literary plagiarism and opportunistic false attributions allowed would-be hack writers to capitalize on the success and fame of actual best-selling authors including, among their many victims, Samuel Butler, Laurence Sterne, and Henry Fielding to name but a precious few. So too must be counted the inventions of William Lauder—the would-be critic who falsely “exposed” Milton’s Paradise Lost as plagiary—Thomas Chatterton’s fatal “Rowley Poet” impostures, and James Macpherson’s incredibly popular, and incredibly fake, verses of the “ancient” Celtic bard “Ossian.”

=== Late modern forgeries ===
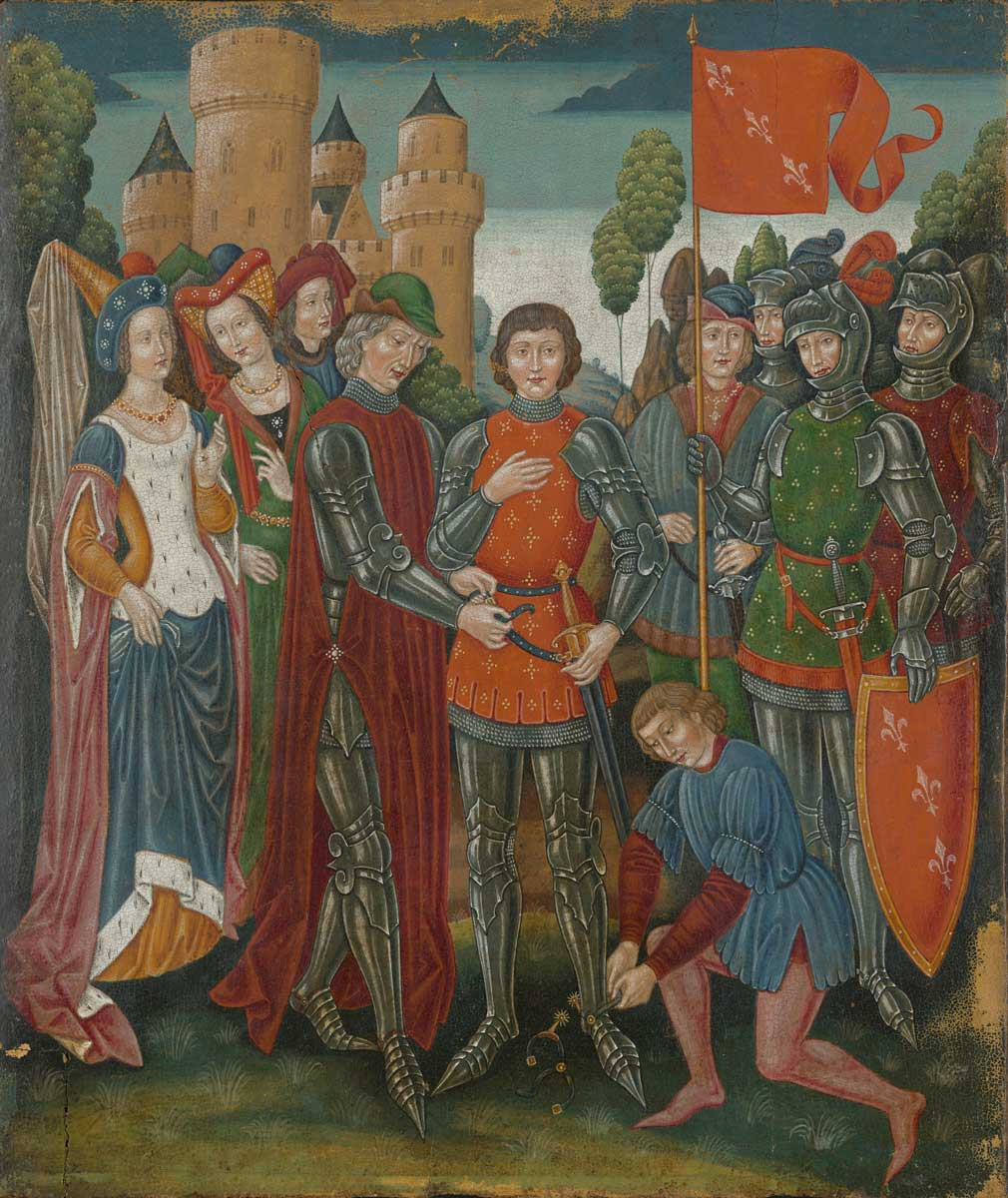
Medieval Fakery: A “Masterpiece” by the Spanish Forger, c. 1900-20 (from the Bibliotheca Fictiva Collection, nr. 8108100)

With the advent of “bibliomania” in the late eighteenth and nineteenth centuries, a new brand of pecuniary forgery emerged, purporting to put into the hands of eager, if also impressionable, book collectors literary artifacts that were definitively “too good to be true.” False “autograph” verses purportedly by Martin Luther and Ben Jonson, forged letters alleged to be by Percy Bysshe Shelley, and “inscribed” books from the personal library of Lord Byron were all invented by a host of con artists happy to cash in on a sometimes red-hot trade in antiquarian books and literary “contact relics.” From the sublime to the ridiculous, the Bibliotheca Fictiva also tracks the deceptions of scholar-forgers like John Payne Collier, who mixed convincing fakery with authentic evidence in manuscript and printed forms, and the follies of bibliophiles so eager to bid on impossibly rare books listed in the fake Fortsas auction catalogue that they traveled to attend this well-advertised but nonexistent sale in the tiny provincial Belgian village of Binche.

Latter-day impersonators like “Princess Caraboo” and the Baltimore-born Bata Kindai Amgoza ibn LoBagola, whose persona as a self-described “African Savage” and descendant of the lost tribes of Israel, occupied their moments in the popular imagination for years. So, too, did the racist “miscegenation pamphlet” hoax that sought (unsuccessfully) to bring down Abraham Lincoln’s antislavery Republican party, and the writings of the preposterous eccentric Charles Otley Groom-Napier, whose invented titles of Prince of Mantua, Montferrat, Ferrera, Nevers, Rethel, and Alençon were nearly as elaborate as his published pseudo-scientific vegetarian cures for dipsomania. Nineteenth-century manuscript fakes, such as Constantine Simonides’s antiqued and “ancient” Greek manuscript on vellum revealing the mysteries of Byzantine painting, and a false thirteenth-century French Crusader charter designed to qualify several French families’ arms for prominent display in Louis Philippe’s Salles des Croisades at Versailles, demonstrate the eternal human desire to discover “lost” works. A fine gathering of medieval illuminations on actual early parchment fragments by the so-called Spanish Forger and his imitators fed the appetites of art collectors eager for more traditional alternatives to latter-day expressionist and surrealist works. False memoirs, such as Friedrich Nietzsche’s My Sister and I and William Mannix’s spurious The Memoirs of Li Hung Chang, are further standouts among the early twentieth-century holdings.

== Access, valorization and digitization ==
A major exhibition of the Bibliotheca Fictiva collection was held in Johns Hopkins's historic George Peabody Library from October 2014 until February 2015. The allied exhibition catalogue was sold out and reprinted in a revised second edition. A complete item-level printed catalogue is available, and a further ‘Continuation’ of which, enumerating all the additions made to the collection post-2014, will be published in 2022–23. A segment of National Public Radio’s Saturday Edition with Scott Simon offers an introduction to the collection, as well as several magazine articles. An international conference convened at JHU also resulted in a volume of essays inspired by the collection being published by the Johns Hopkins University Press. About one hundred of the earliest and rarest books in the Bibliotheca Fictiva have been digitized in early 2022 and made freely available on the Internet Archive, with the support of the Arcadia Fund, with the hope of much more digital access being provided to the full collection in the coming years. All items in the Bibliotheca Fictiva are also accessible through the JHU online catalogue and Hopkins archival finding aids.
