= Johns Hopkins Club =

Private member's club

The Johns Hopkins Club is a private club located on the grounds of the Homewood Campus of Johns Hopkins University at 3400 North Charles Street in Baltimore, Maryland.

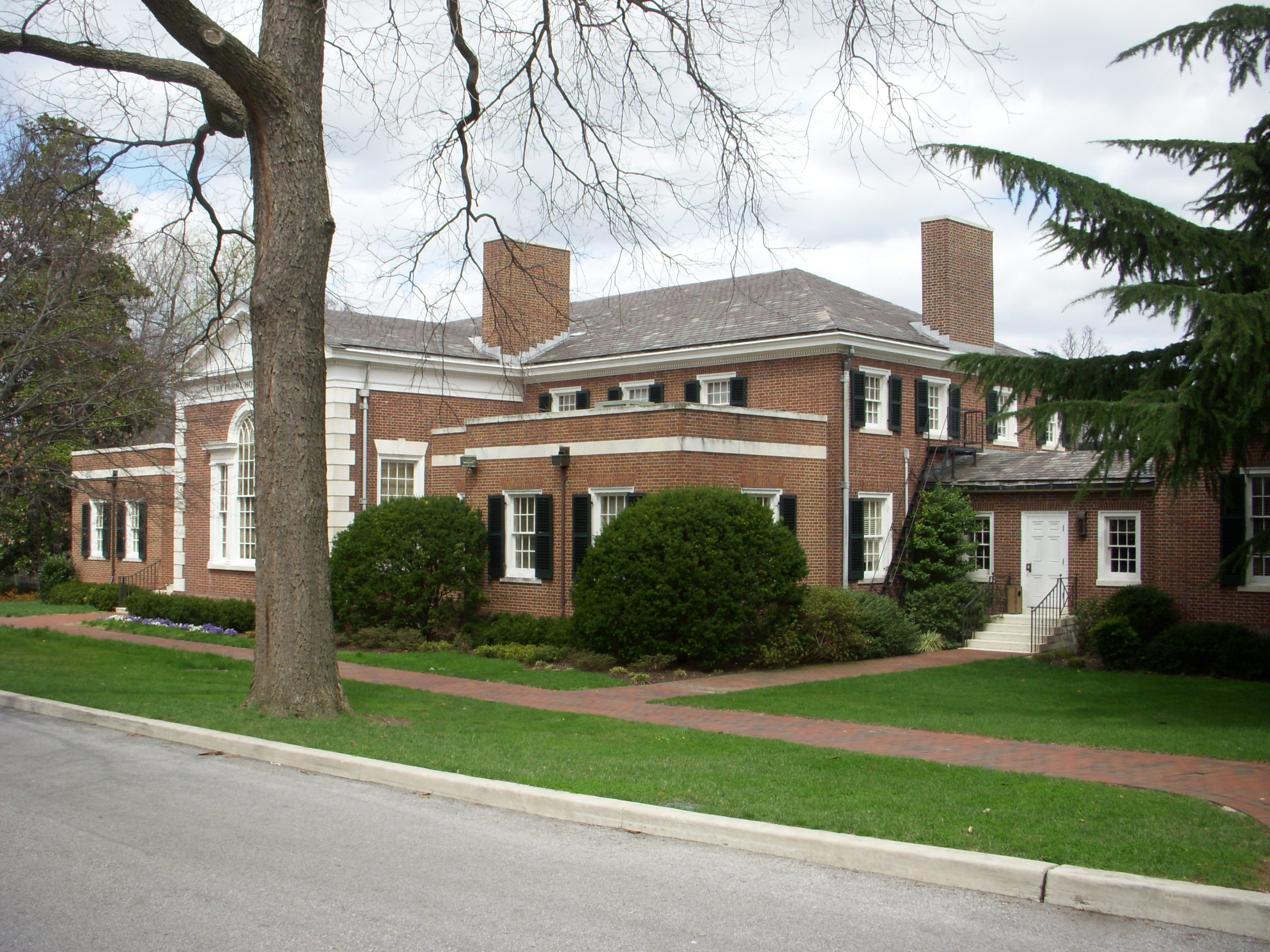
Johns Hopkins Club

== History ==
The creation of the Johns Hopkins Club was inspired by Herbert Baxter Adams who, after a visit to the Yale Graduates Club in New Haven wanted to provide a similar facility for Hopkins. The club was officially organized in December 1899, with 260 charter members. One of the founders of the Club was Alfred Jenkins Shriver, a member of the Johns Hopkins Class of 1891, for whom Shriver Hall is named on Hopkins' Homewood Campus.

The club includes a membership of both men and women, restricted to alumni, faculty, and full-time graduate students of Johns Hopkins University. The Club now is home to over 4,000 members.

== Installations ==
When the University moved to the Homewood campus, the Johns Hopkins Club moved with it, occupying the Homewood House until 1929, when it became a museum. In 1936, the university alumnus and trustee Theodore Marburg and his family provided the funds to construct the current building. It was designed by architects Wrenn, Lewis and Jencks, reinterpreting the style of Homewood House, continuing the tradition of Georgian buildings on campus. It has a dramatic spiral staircase inside. Several additions have been made since then, including offices and additional dining and kitchen space, notably in 1956, 1981 and 1987.

== See also ==
- Johns Hopkins University
