= A Bright Red Scream =

1998 book by Marilee Strong

A Bright Red Scream: Self-Mutilation and the Language of Pain
- Cover of the 1st edition
- Author: Marilee Strong
- Language: English
- Subject: Self-harm
- Published: 1998 (Viking Press)
- Publication place: United States
- Media type: Print
- Pages: 232
- ISBN: 0-670-87781-6
- OCLC: 39281973
- Dewey Decimal: 616.8582
- LC Class: RC552

A Bright Red Scream: Self-Mutilation and the Language of Pain is a 1998 non-fiction psychology book written by American journalist Marilee Strong about self-harm. Published by Viking Press, it is the first general interest book on self-harm.

== Background ==
In 1987, American psychiatrist Armando Favazza published Bodies Under Siege: Self-mutilation in Culture and Psychiatry, the first psychiatric text on the subject of self-harm. Marilee Strong was an American journalist who had spent several weeks in Mozambique on a Pulitzer Fellowship reporting on the psychological trauma experienced by children as a result of the civil war. When she returned to the United States, she heard about self-harm and decided to research the subject. In 1993, she wrote an article for San Francisco Focus entitled "A Bright Red Scream", part of a surge in media interest in the topic in the years following the publication of Favazza's book. Strong's was the first in-depth magazine article on self-harm and was the cover story for that issue. To research the book, she interviewed over 50 people who intentionally harm themselves, many of them by cutting. She also interviewed neuroscientists, psychologists and psychiatrists, including Favazza, a recognised expert on self-harm, and Bessel van der Kolk, a specialist in posttraumatic stress disorder. The title of the article and book came from an interview with a self-harmer who described the action of self-mutilation as a cry for help, calling it "a bright red scream".

== Subject ==
Millions of people in the United States regularly engage in self-harm, intentionally injuring themselves. Many of them use sharp objects such as knives, razors or broken glass to cut themselves. Strong set out to find the meaning behind this intentional self-harm, exploring related fields of research like child abuse, addiction and posttraumatic stress disorder.

== Critical reception ==
Charles R. Swenson reviewed the book for American Psychiatric Association journal Psychiatric Services. He called it "an illuminating and compassionate book" and said that the "greatest strength of this book is journalistic." Regarding Strong's focus on the childhood psychological trauma experienced by many cutters, he criticised her for neglecting "the nearly 50 percent of self-mutilating individuals who do not report trauma histories". Writing for Time, Tamala M. Edwards called it "a compelling tour of the trauma and science of self-injury".
