= Papyrus Oxyrhynchus 296 =

Greek papyrus fragment

Papyrus Oxyrhynchus 296 (P. Oxy. 296 or P. Oxy. II 296) is a Letter concerning Taxation, in Greek. It was discovered in Oxyrhynchus. The manuscript was written on papyrus in the form of a sheet. It was written between 37-55. Currently it is housed in the Milton S. Eisenhower Library of the Johns Hopkins University in Baltimore.

== Description ==
The measurements of the fragment are 113 by 74 mm.

The document was written by Heraclides and was addressed to Asclatas.

This papyrus was written in the first year of an emperor, who was probably Gaius, Claudius, or Nero.

== See also ==
- Oxyrhynchus Papyri
