= Women of the Book Collection =

Special collection of Johns Hopkins University's The Sheridan Libraries

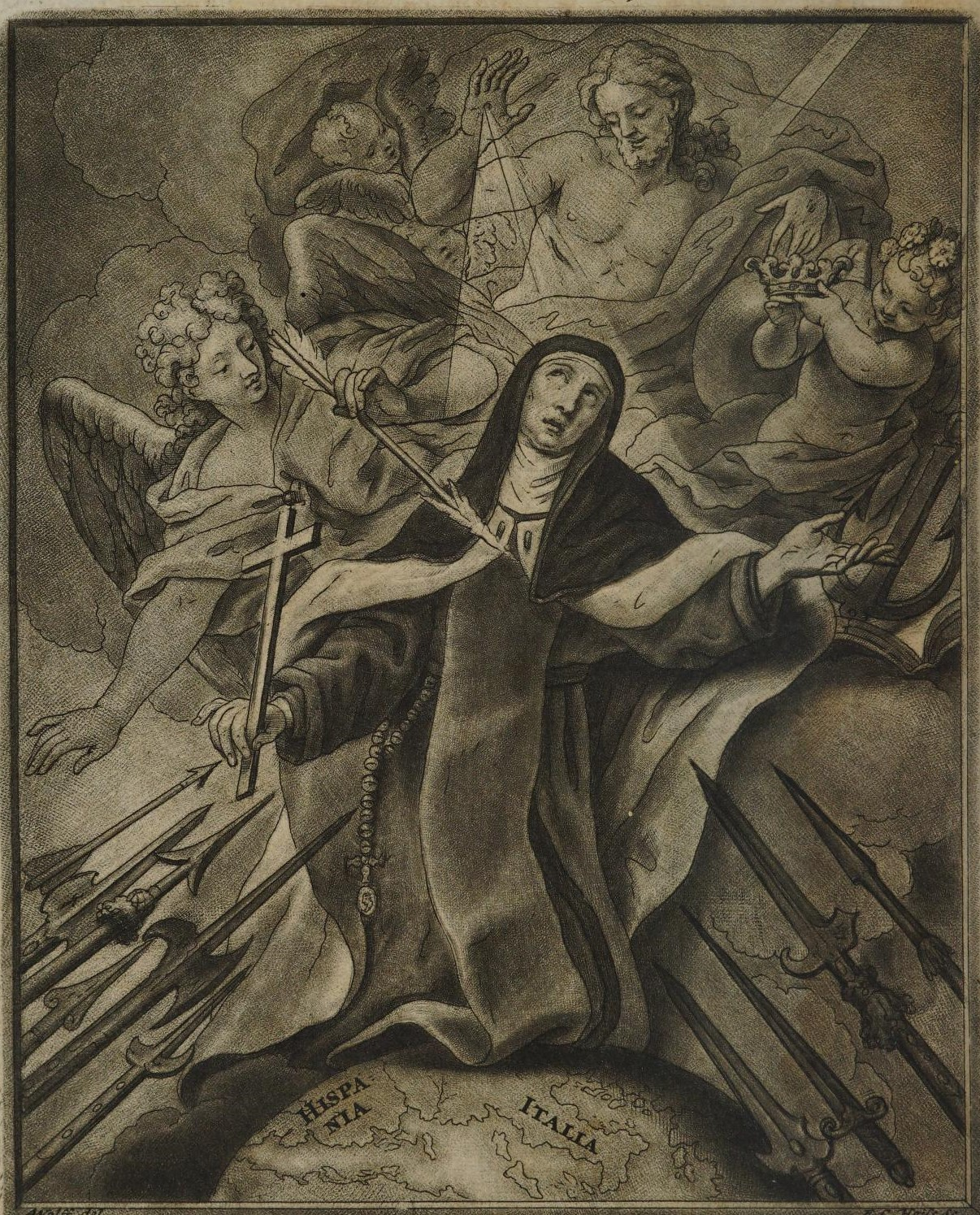
Engraving of Teresa of Ávila by Elias Christoph Heiss, frontispiece of Quirinus a Sanctissima Trinitate, Teutsch vorgestellte Spanische Heldin, Munich, 1714 (from the Women of the Book Collection, nr. 6743775)

The Women of the Book Collection is the largest gathering of rare books, pamphlets, manuscripts, and ephemera dedicated entirely to the lives and cultural experiences of early modern women, circa 1450–1800. It is held at the Special Collections Department of Johns Hopkins University's The Sheridan Libraries. What distinguishes the collection is its singular focus on Roman Catholic women religious, in particular nuns, female mystics and miracle workers, and lay holy women.

== Scope ==
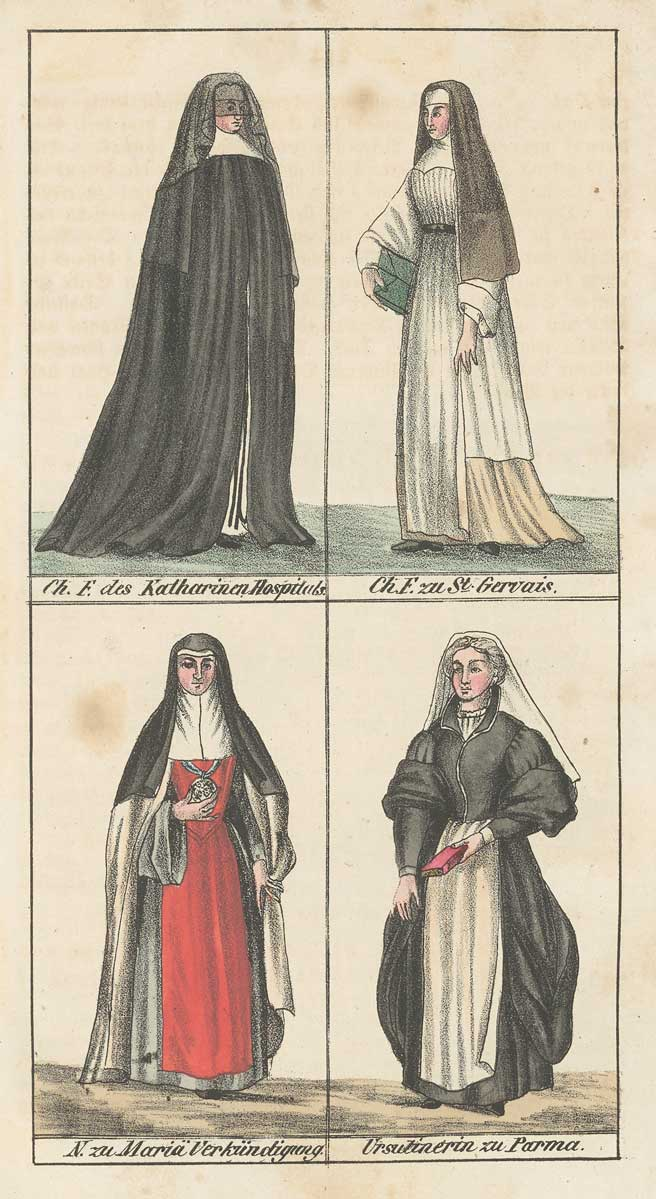
Plate from a convent costume book (from the Women of the Book Collection, nr. 9377030)

The vast majority of the collection, perhaps as much as 90 percent of some 725 individual items in total, dates from the seventeenth and eighteenth centuries, and are almost entirely printed in vernacular languages. The collection reflects the linguistic and geographic diversity of early modern female monasticism; approximately half of its materials are Italian and French, while the rest include significant Spanish holdings (as well as a number of items produced in the Spanish Empire), several Flemish works, and smaller numbers of largely German, Swiss, and Portuguese books.

The titles are also generally quite rare: nearly one-third of the items are completely unrepresented in North American libraries; one-quarter survive in just a handful of recorded copies; and one-fifth are entirely unrecorded elsewhere and presumably unique. Approximately one-quarter of the books in the collection bear unique manuscript annotations reflecting past provenance and adaptive or interpretive marginalia.

== Production context ==
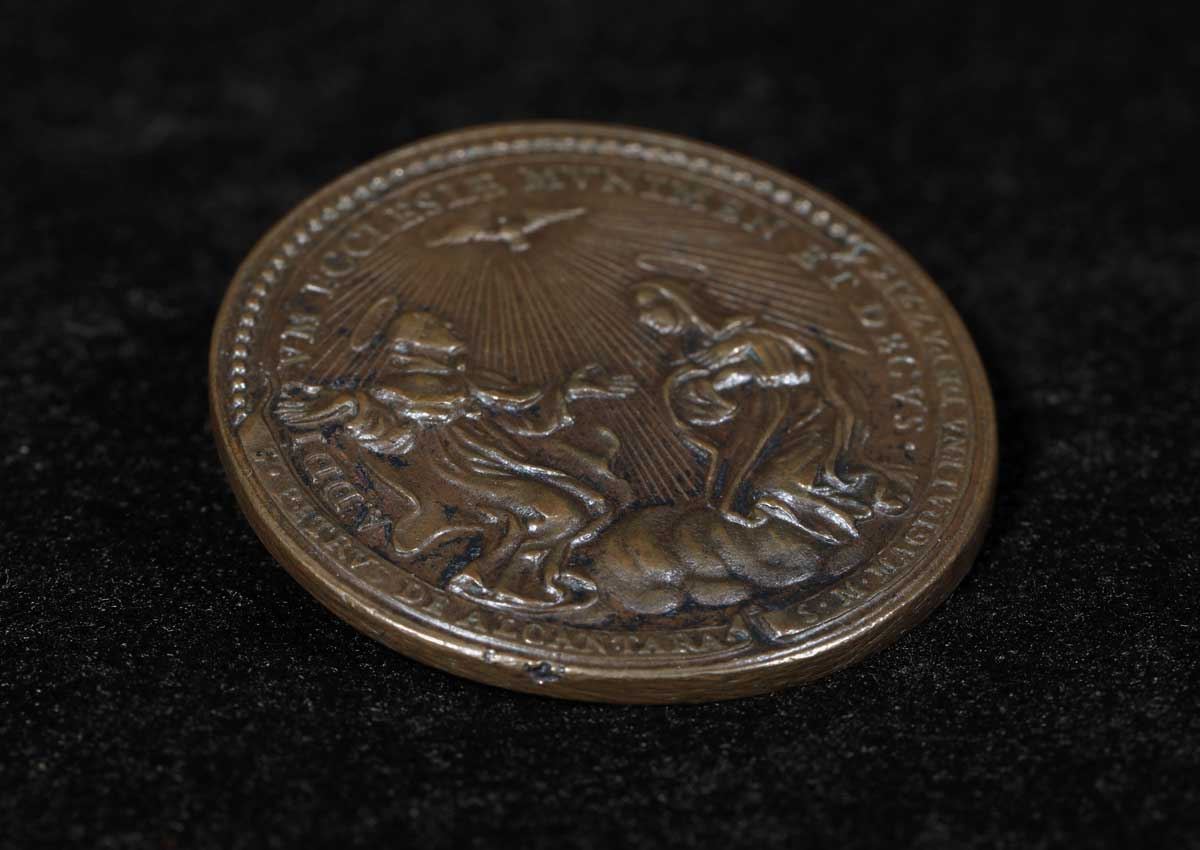
Medal commemorating the canonization of Pedro de Alcántara and Maria Maddalena de' Pazzi, Rome, 1669 (from the Women of the Book Collection, nr. 7595989)

Cloistered convents, and female religious houses more generally, provided early modern women with access to a contemplative life of the mind—including educational opportunities, conventual libraries, and the resources needed to compose original works of theological, devotional, mystical, and liturgical significance—thanks to their protected status within the Roman Catholic Church.

Though driven largely by the proliferation of reformed medieval and newly founded early modern female monastic orders—the Ursulines, Discalced Carmelites, Visitandines, and Conceptionists—this print culture reflected growing interest in the beatification, canonization, and veneration of famously devout Catholic women religious. One of the best-represented women in the collection was a model of early modern piety, sanctity, and intellectual achievement, and one of the first beneficiaries of major reforms in the Congregation of Rites that governed the processes and increased speed of sanctification: Saint Teresa of Avila (died 1582, beatified 1614, canonized 1622). Other "celebrity" nuns well represented in the collection that follow the Teresian model include Maria Maddalena de' Pazzi, Maria de Ágreda, Rose of Lima, Jeanne-Françoise Frémiot de Chantal, and Marguerite Marie Alacoque, among many others.

== Subjects and genres ==
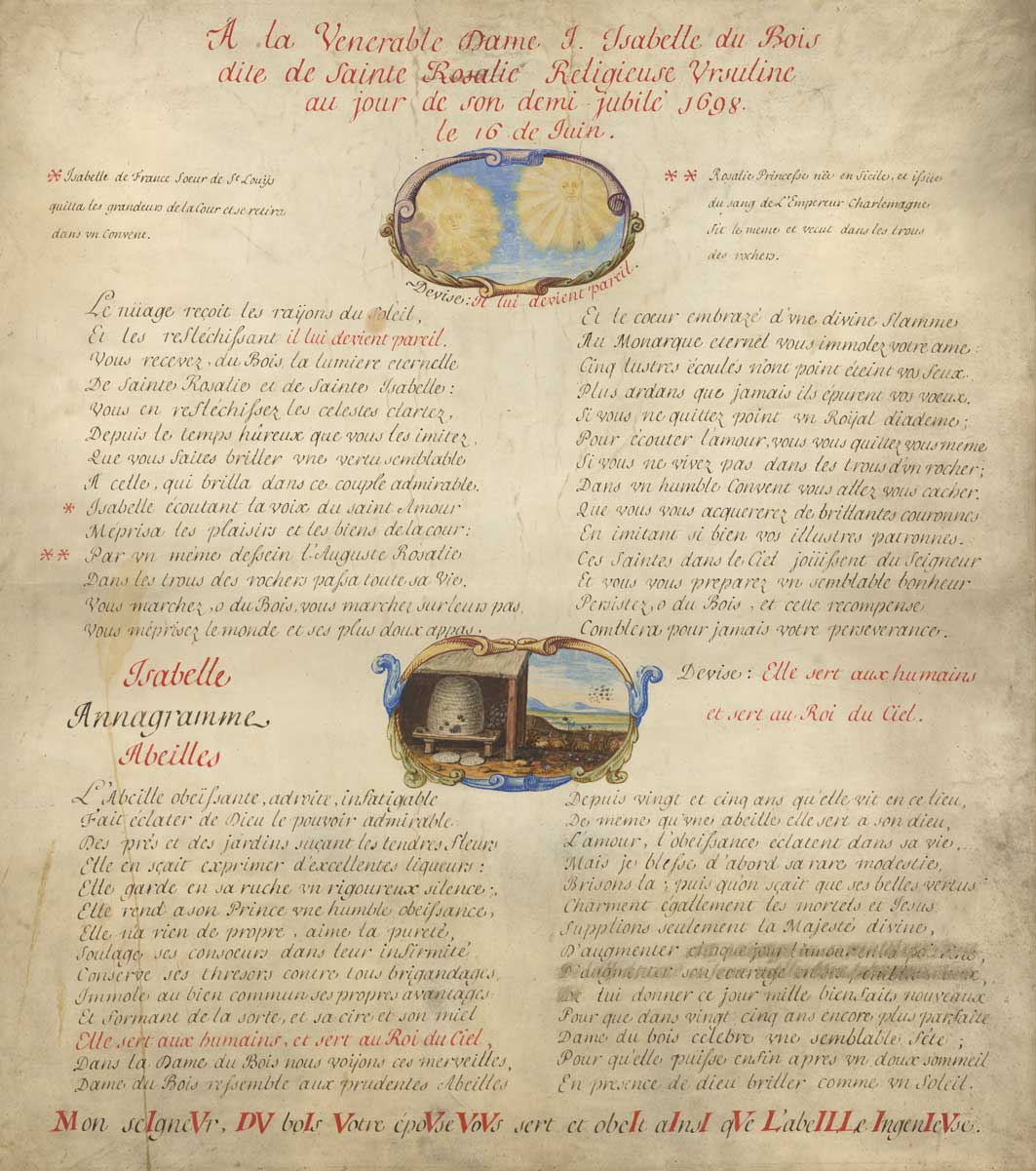
Emblems and texts in honor of the demi-jubilee of Ursuline sister Jeanne-Isabelle du Bois de Sainte Rosalie, on June 16, 1698 (from the Women of the Book Collection, nr. 7532559)

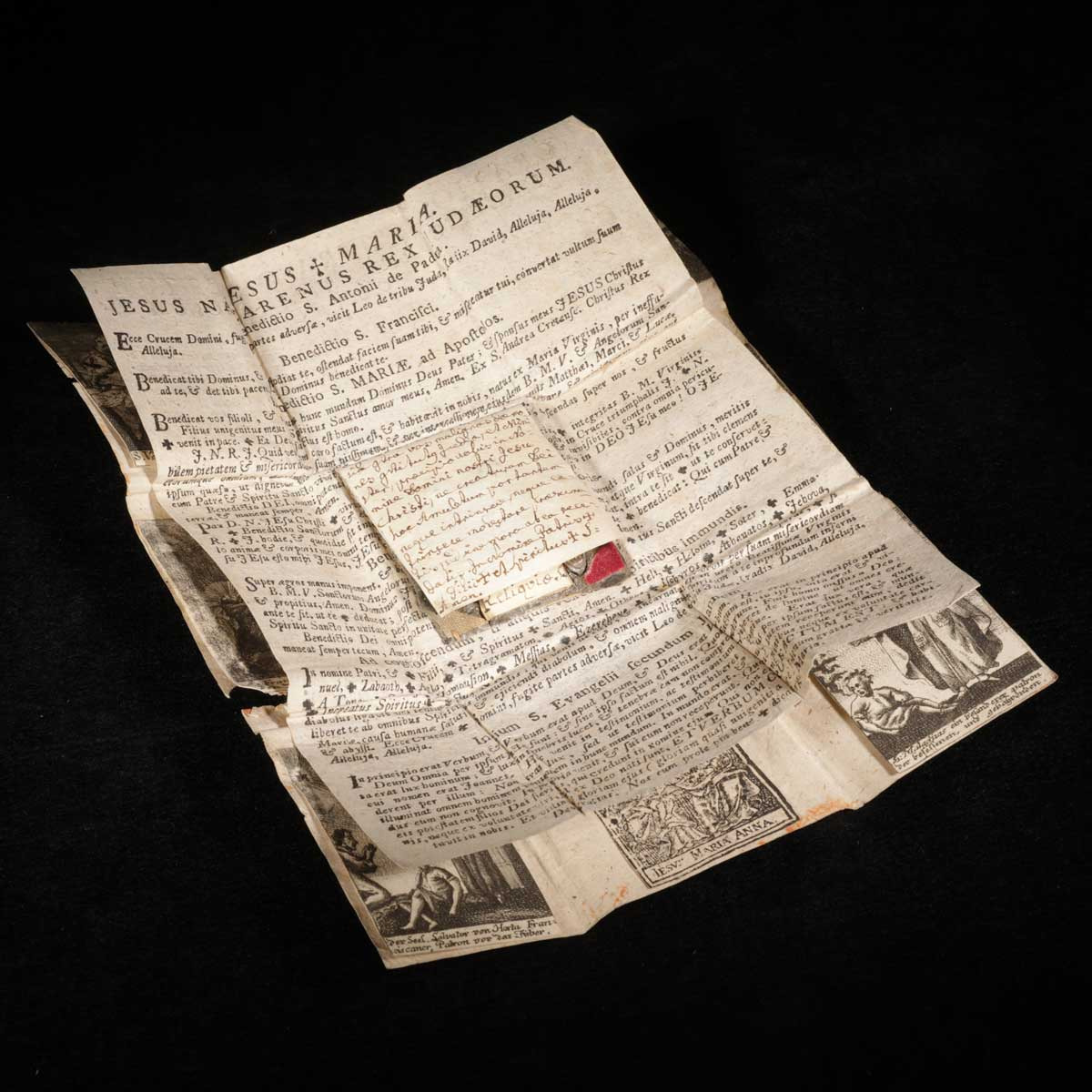
Reliquary folded book amulet or 'breverl' produced by nuns in Austria or southern Germany to be sold to visitors and pilgrims, c. 1760 (from the Women of the Book Collection, nr. 8042471)

The most common genres within this literature are biographical and hagiographical accounts of the exemplary lives of these religious women. However, the subjects range dramatically and encompass many varieties of devotional, ecclesiastical, liturgical, mystical, and missionary subjects, including prayer books (many with unique musical notations); the rules and constitutions of particular orders and lay female confraternities; texts relating to everyday life and the domestic economy of convents; libros de professiones (matriculation record books for individual convents); illustrated plate books representing the lives and deeds of saintly nuns; personal devotions to the Virgin Mary and venerations of female saints; works related to female labor in hospitals and in medicine more generally; lawsuits and legal testimony of miracles (particularly female bilocation), demonic possession, exorcism, and autos-de-fé; foundation accounts of female monastic houses in the New World; education and teaching; costume books; convent plays and procession accounts; and works printed by orders of reformed sex workers.

Due to the Catholic tradition of treating books and material objects as holy and invested with spiritual power in early modern Europe, there is also a wide range of custom-made items in the collection, including apotropaic book amulets, embroidered and painted bindings, contact relics, and various klosterarbeiten (objets d'art made by nuns for sale to pilgrims), including elaborately framed devotional portraits and various para-liturgical devices. The Women of the Book Collection also holds dozens of printed single-sheet ephemera, almost all of which are unrecorded in any other copies. These include original engraved copperplates, indulgence sheets, investiture poems, ex voto and holy cards, confraternity charters, and bespoke illustrated and illuminated documents of profession.

== Valorization and digitization ==
The Sheridan Libraries started acquiring items for the collection from 2017 onward. An international conference sponsored by the Virginia Fox Stern Center was convened in the fall of 2019, which formed the basis of a forthcoming, heavily illustrated book on the collection to be jointly published in 2023 by the Pennsylvania State University Press and the Stern Center. A major exhibition of the collection is ongoing in Johns Hopkins's historic George Peabody Library (September 2022 – January 2023). A research fellowship program focusing on the collection has also been created, and jointly sponsored by the Stern Center and the Renaissance Society of America. Approximately 90 percent of the Women of the Book Collection has been digitized supported by a grant from the Arcadia Fund and is freely accessible through the Internet Archive.
