= Bodies Under Siege =

1987 book by Armando Favazza

Bodies Under Siege: Self-mutilation in Culture and Psychiatry
- Title page for Bodies Under Siege: Self-mutilation in Culture and Psychiatry (1987)
- Author: Armando Favazza
- Language: English
- Genre: Non-fiction
- Publication date: 1987

Bodies Under Siege: Self-mutilation in Culture and Psychiatry is a book written by psychiatrist Dr. Armando Favazza, and published in 1987.

Bodies Under Siege is a psychiatric book on self-harm. The second edition (1996) was subtitled Self-Mutilation and Body Modification in Culture and Psychiatry.

Favazza's classification divides self-harm behaviors into two major categories, namely Culturally Sanctioned and Deviant. The subtypes of the former are practices and rituals. Practices often are faddish and include tattoos and body piercing. Ritual body modification behaviors are traditional and reflect the history, spiritualism, and beliefs of a society. They are culturally and psychologically embedded in profound, elemental experiences especially connected to healing, spirituality, and social orderliness. Understanding body modification rituals sheds light on Deviant behaviors which, in Favazza's classification, include Major, Stereotypic, Compulsive, and Impulsive. Each subtype is usually associated with specific mental disorders. The Major type, for example, exemplified by self-castration or eye-enucleation, is usually associated with psychosis, transsexualism, and/or substance intoxication. The most common type is the Impulsive, as exemplified by skin-cutting and burning, and is associated with a broad variety of disorders including generalized anxiety, post-traumatic stress disorder, and antisocial, histrionic, and borderline personality disorder.

One aspect of body modification discussed by Favazza is the concept of the "skin/self border". Favazza describes the skin as one of the most simple physiological organs of the human body, but one having a very complex impact on human psychology.

In the "skin/self border" school of thought, Favazza theorizes that the skin is the ultimate border between a person and the outside world and in modifying this border, a person exercises a level of control of or communication with the relationship his/her body has with the outside world.

== See also ==
- A Bright Red Scream (1998), the first general interest book on self-harm
