= Chron.com =

American news website

Chron
- Website type: News website
- Available in: English
- Headquarters: 4747 Southwest Freeway, Houston, Texas, {{{location_country}}}
- Owner: Hearst Newspapers
- Website: www.chron.com
- Launched: 2012
- Current status: Active

Chron (also called Chron.com) is a news website based in Houston, Texas, that was founded in 2012. Chron.com was once the digital home for the Houston Chronicle, but in 2012 became an independent site. The publications share a parent company, Hearst Newspapers, and maintain separate newsrooms.

== Notable contributions ==
In October 2024, Chron religion reporter, Eric Killelea, covered the news that the pastor of Lakepointe Church in Rockwall, Texas, had instructed congregants how to vote in the 2024 United States presidential election via a sermon titled "How to Vote Like Jesus." In response to this reporting, the Freedom From Religion Foundation called on the Internal Revenue Service to revoke the tax-free privileges of the church. As of March 1, 2025, Lakepointe Church is still designated as a 501(c)(3) organization.
