= Homewood Campus of Johns Hopkins University =

Campus of Johns Hopkins University in north Baltimore, Maryland, United States

Coordinates: 39.333°N 76.621°W

The Homewood Campus is the main academic and administrative center of the Johns Hopkins University. It is located at 3400 North Charles Street in Baltimore, Maryland. It houses the two major undergraduate schools: the Zanvyl Krieger School of Arts and Sciences and the Whiting School of Engineering.

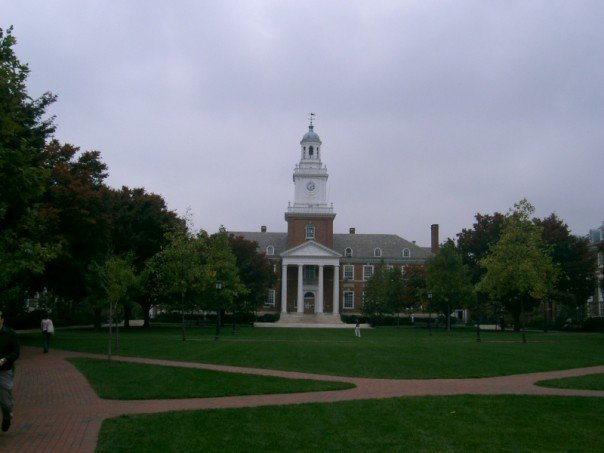
Gilman Hall at the head of the Upper Quad

== History ==
In his will, Johns Hopkins (1795–1873) left his summer home and estate, Clifton, then northeast of Baltimore, off the Harford Road, to the university for its new campus along with $7 million, split between the university and a hospital, also named for him. One of his provisions was that only interest obtained from his stock in the Baltimore and Ohio Railroad could be used to build facilities for the university. Unfortunately, after Johns Hopkins' death, the B&O Railroad fell into mismanagement; its eventual financial collapse was hastened by the Financial Panic and Recession of 1893 and the stock's value declined drastically. Therefore, the original campus of the university was established by first president Daniel Coit Gilman in downtown Baltimore along North Howard Street, between West Center, Little Ross, and West Monument Streets on the west side of the Mount Vernon-Belvedere neighborhood, where buildings were already available. However, this location did not permit room for growth and soon the trustees began to look for a place to move. Eventually, Hopkins would relocate to the former Homewood House and Estate of Charles Carroll Jr. (son of Charles Carroll of Carrollton, 1737–1832) built 1801–1803, and the later Wyman Villa estate of JHU Board member William Wyman, built in the 1880s. Here JHU created the park-like main campus of Hopkins Homewood, set on 140 acres (0.57 km^{2}) in what today lies between the north Baltimore neighborhoods of Charles Village (begun in the 1870s, and then known as Peabody Heights) to the east, the planned suburban-style communities of Guilford (established 1913) and Roland Park (established early 1890s) to the north, and to the west, the mill towns of Hampden-Woodberry along the Jones Falls stream valleys and tributary Stony Run through Wyman Park and the Wyman Park Dell.

As a part of the donation, the university was required to dedicate part of the land to art. As a result, the Baltimore Museum of Art (founded 1914), which has ties to but is not a part of the university, is situated next to the university campus, just southeast of Shriver Hall on Art Museum Drive. Several blocks north of the campus, also on North Charles Street, there is the Evergreen House, former mansion home of the B&O Railroad's Garrett Family and now one of JHU's house museums, just past East Cold Spring Lane and the neighboring former Loyola College, now Loyola University Maryland.

The majority of buildings on the portion of North Charles Street that borders Homewood are owned and operated by the university and are informally part of the Homewood Campus.

== Architecture ==
The architectural style of the campus follows the Federal style of Homewood House. Most newer buildings resemble this style, being built of red brick with white marble trim. Homewood House was later used for administrative offices but now is preserved as a museum. The space is organized in quads around Gilman Hall.

In 1997, the university purchased the vacant 200,000-square-foot (19,000 m^{2}) former building of the old all-girls Eastern High School (founded 1844, building constructed 1938). Old EHS is a three-story high H-shaped building of red brick and limestone trim in English Tudor revival architecture, on East 33rd St., one mile (1.6 km) east of the "Homewood" campus. It is immediately across the street from the former site of the old Memorial Stadium of 1950, where the Major League baseball Baltimore Orioles and the NFL pro football's Baltimore Colts used to play. The former Eastern High building with its antique interior features was reopened in 2001, largely renovated and reconstructed, occupied by administrative offices for the Johns Hopkins Medical Institutions.

The university undertook a major renovation of the Homewood Campus in 2000–2002. Asphalt, vehicle-accessible roads throughout the campus were replaced with brick-paved walkways. The traffic circle located in front of the Milton S. Eisenhower Library, facing North Charles Street, which for many years had existed as a half circle that connected to campus roads, was completed, in line with the original Master Plan for the university. Traffic was redirected to the periphery of the campus and greenery was added throughout the campus, with the goal of making the core areas of Homewood safer, more pedestrian-friendly and more attractive. A number of new buildings, including Clark Hall (home to the Biomedical Engineering department), Hodson Hall (a multi-use classroom building), the Mattin Center (a student arts and activities center), the Ralph S. O'Connor Recreation Center, and the New Chemistry Building, were also constructed in the early 2000s (decade).

A second campus expansion, called Charles Commons, was completed in September 2006. It is located across North Charles Street from Homewood, at 33rd Street between Charles and St. Paul Streets. The approximately 350,000 sq ft (33,000 m^{2}) development includes housing for approximately 618 students, with supporting amenity spaces; a central dining facility and specialty dining area with seating capacity of approximately 330; and an approximately 29,000 sq ft (2,700 m^{2}) book store run by Barnes and Noble College Division until 2024, when Hopkins took over the operation. This occurred in conjunction with the opening of the brand new Bloomberg Student Center completed in 2025.

The Decker Quadrangle development constituted the last large building site on the contiguous Homewood Campus. Its first phase included a visitors and admissions center (Mason Hall), a computational sciences building (Hackerman Hall), and an underground parking structure, which together created a new quadrangle, south of Garland Hall, named in honor of Alonso G. and Virginia G. Decker. Construction was completed and the new buildings and quadrangle were dedicated in 2008. Importantly, the project established a new public entrance for the campus and recognizes the potential for future growth of campus activities sited across Wyman Park Drive to the west.

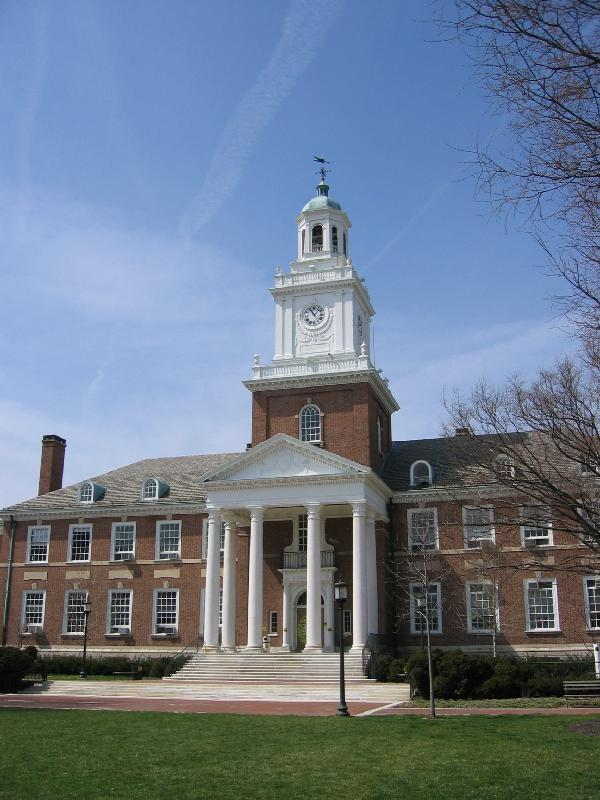
Gilman Hall

In 2007, the university announced a $73 million renovation of Gilman Hall (named for the university's first president, Daniel Coit Gilman), the academic centerpiece of the Homewood Campus. The building had grown labyrinthine over the years, with former library stacks being used as offices and only half the building's stairwells reaching all its floors. The renovation included updates to all classrooms in the building, as well as a full replacement of the building's infrastructure. The renovation involved removal of the bookstore, bank and credit union, creating more space for academic departments. The Hutzler Undergraduate Reading Room was also renovated, and a dedicated film screening room was added. The centerpiece of the renovation was a large glass-roofed atrium, connecting the building's entrance and the Hutzler Reading Room, that now houses the university's premier archaeological collection. The building was formally dedicated on October 23, 2010, as the home of the university's humanities departments.

In early December 2008, the Trustees proposed the construction of a new Library addition, the Brody Learning Commons, costing $30 million. The building features a quiet reading room, 15 new group study rooms, a new atrium and a café. Ground was officially broken on June 6, 2010, with a completion date of July 2012.

The Space Telescope Science Institute is located on the Homewood Campus and controls, analyzes, and collects data from both the Hubble Space Telescope and James Webb Space Telescope.

In 2006, Johns Hopkins University, working with Collegetown Development Alliance, a joint-venture team composed of Struever Brothers, Eccles & Rouse and Capstone Development, teamed up to develop a mixed-use project featuring student housing, a central dining facility and a major campus book store.

=== Milton S. Eisenhower Library ===
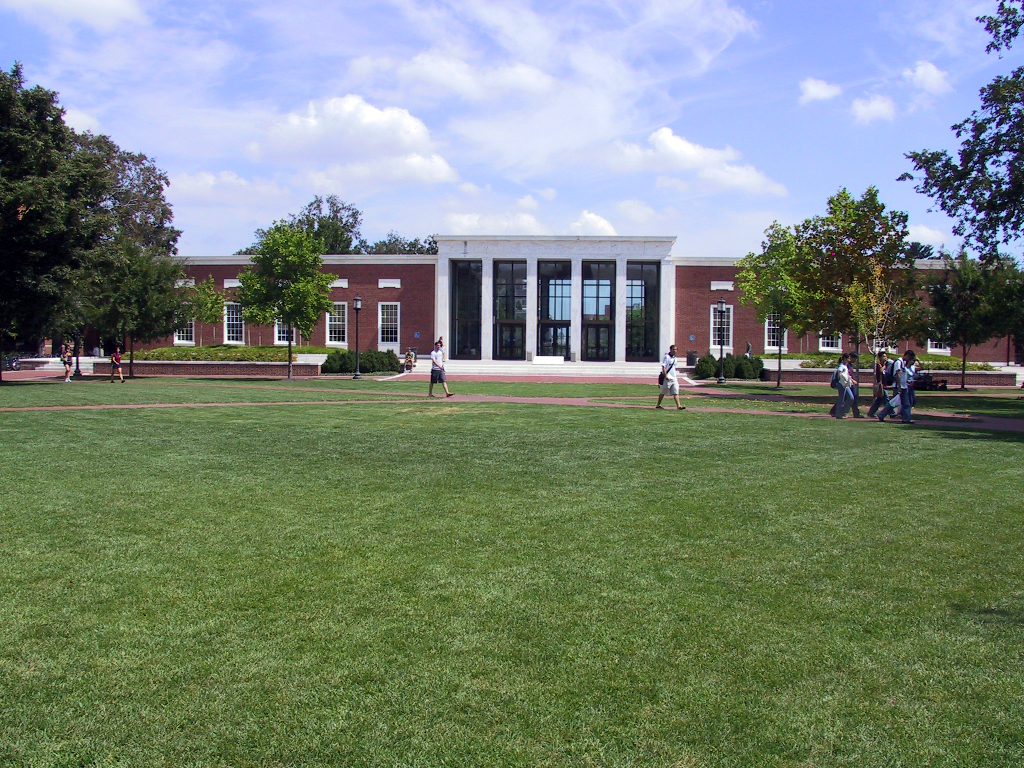
Milton S. Eisenhower Library

The Milton S. Eisenhower Library (called MSE by students), is the Johns Hopkins University principal research library and the largest in a network of libraries at Johns Hopkins. This network, known as 'The Sheridan Libraries', encompasses the Milton S. Eisenhower Library and its collections at the Albert D. Hutzler Reading Room in Gilman Hall (the library before Eisenhower was constructed, and informally called The Hut by students), the John Work Garrett Library at Evergreen House and the Peabody Institute Library and adjacent public historic George Peabody Library at Mount Vernon Place, across from the Washington Monument. Opened in 1964, the Eisenhower Library was named for the university's eighth and tenth president, Milton S. Eisenhower, brother of former U.S. 34th President, Dwight D. Eisenhower, whose vision brought together the university's rich collection of books, journals and other scholarly resources.

The Eisenhower Library collection houses over 3.8 million volumes, 121,000 journal subscriptions and thirty miles of shelf space. Strengths in the humanities include German and Romance Languages, Philosophy, and the Ancient Near East. In science and engineering, collection strengths include biomedical engineering, chemistry, and environmental engineering. The Library also offers an extensive array of electronic resources, including full-text books and journals, specialized databases, and statistical and cartographic data. Some notable collections held at the Special Collections department of the Eisenhower Library are the Machen collection of incunabula, the Dorothy McIlvain Scott Collection, the Hinkes Collection of Scientific Discovery, the Women's Suffrage Collection, the Arthur and Janet Freeman Bibliotheca Fictiva Collection on the history of literary and historical forgery, and the Women of the Book Collection, the world's largest collection of research materials focused specifically on the religious culture of early modern women.

Only two of the MSE library's six stories are above ground, the rest are beneath. However, the architects designed the building so that every level has windows and natural light. The design is in accordance with a campus myth that no structure on campus can be taller than Gilman Hall, the oldest academic building from 1914.

==== The Brody Learning Commons ====
The Brody Learning Commons, an appendage to the Milton S. Eisenhower Library, opened in August 2012 and is the most recent of the Johns Hopkins' libraries (known as Sheridan Libraries) to open. Primarily a study space, it houses a variety of different areas for study including group study rooms, a quiet reading room and a cafe. The BLC is open 24 hours a day, seven days a week and is also where the university's Department of Special Collections and Department of Conservation and Preservation reside.

=== Homewood House ===
Homewood House is a museum on the Homewood Campus that centers around Baltimore life in the early 1800s. The House, which itself is Palladian and Federal architecturally, is used to display objects that represent the decor that the Carroll family used to furnish the house while they resided there in the early 19th century.

=== Nichols House ===
The Nichols House is known as the President's House because, when designed, it was intended to become the residence of the university's president.

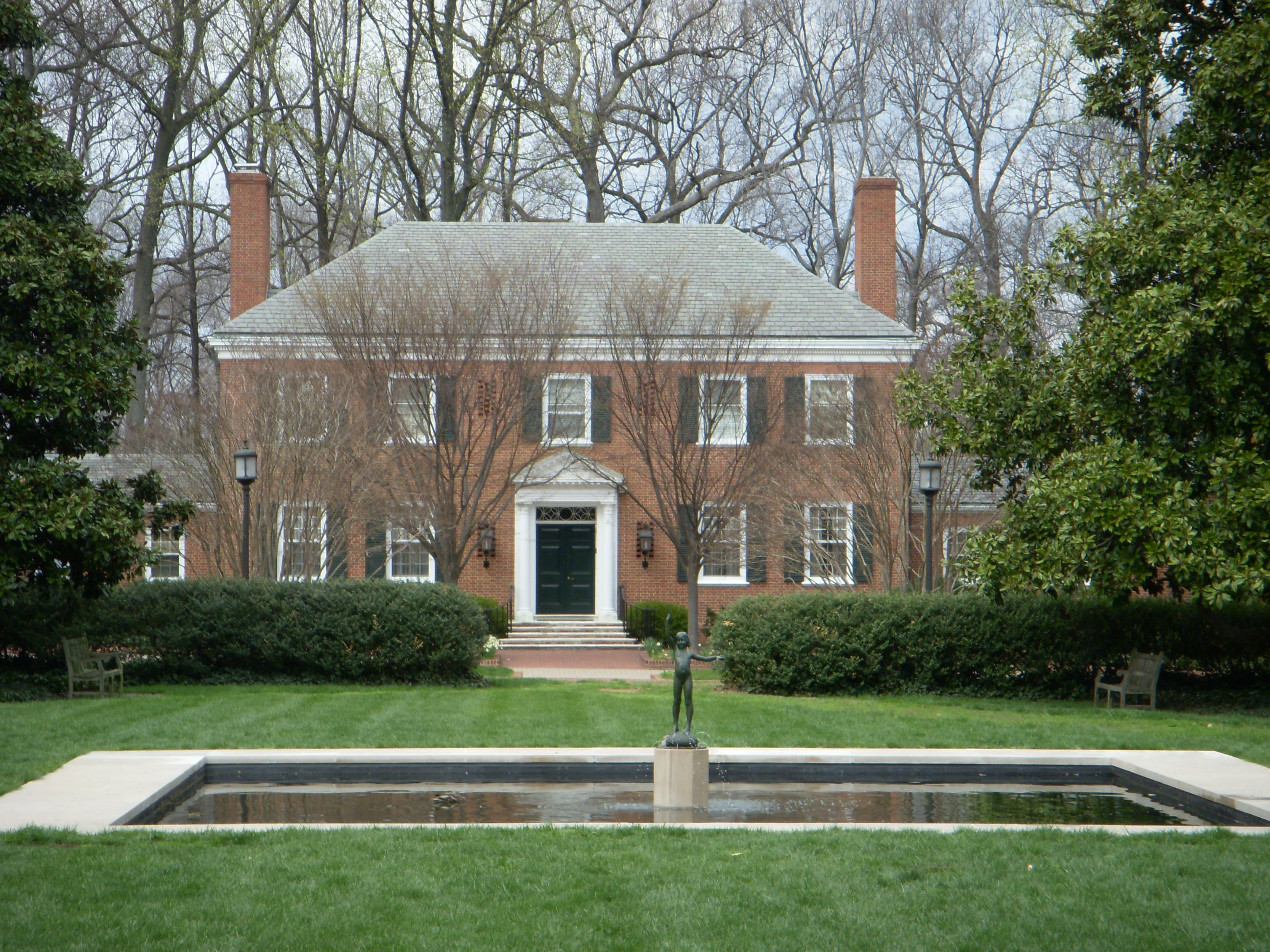
Nichols House

The house has a two-story Georgian structure and it was built in 1958. It was built to attract Milton S. Eisenhower to come to JHU. Eisenhower was its first resident in 1959, and it continues to house presidents. However, from 1971 to 1996, three presidents declined to occupy it, so it was used to house university guests and as administrative offices. Russian president Boris Yeltsin stayed there, and the house was used as a location during the filming of The Seduction of Joe Tynan. In 1996, William R. Brody became the 13th president of the university and opted to once again live at Nichols House.

=== Johns Hopkins Archaeological Museum ===
The museum was founded in 1882. The collection is currently displayed in Gilman Hall, with renovation completed in 2010. The collection contains over 7,000 objects from ancient Greece, Rome, Egypt, the Near East, and the ancient Americas. The museum also displays numerous items on loan, including 200 Egyptian artifacts from the Eton College Myers Collection, Greek ceramics from the Baltimore Museum of Art and an Egyptian mummy from Goucher College.

=== Lacrosse Museum and National Hall of Fame ===
The Lacrosse Museum and National Hall of Fame, maintained by US Lacrosse, was on the Homewood campus adjacent to the home field for the lacrosse teams, Homewood Field, until 2016. Johns Hopkins lacrosse teams have represented the United States in international competition. At the 1928 Summer Olympics in Amsterdam and 1932 Los Angeles Summer Olympics lacrosse demonstration events Hopkins represented the US and team members received Olympic gold medals. This was the only such accolade in the history of US college sports. They have also gone to Melbourne, Australia to win the 1974 World Lacrosse Championship.

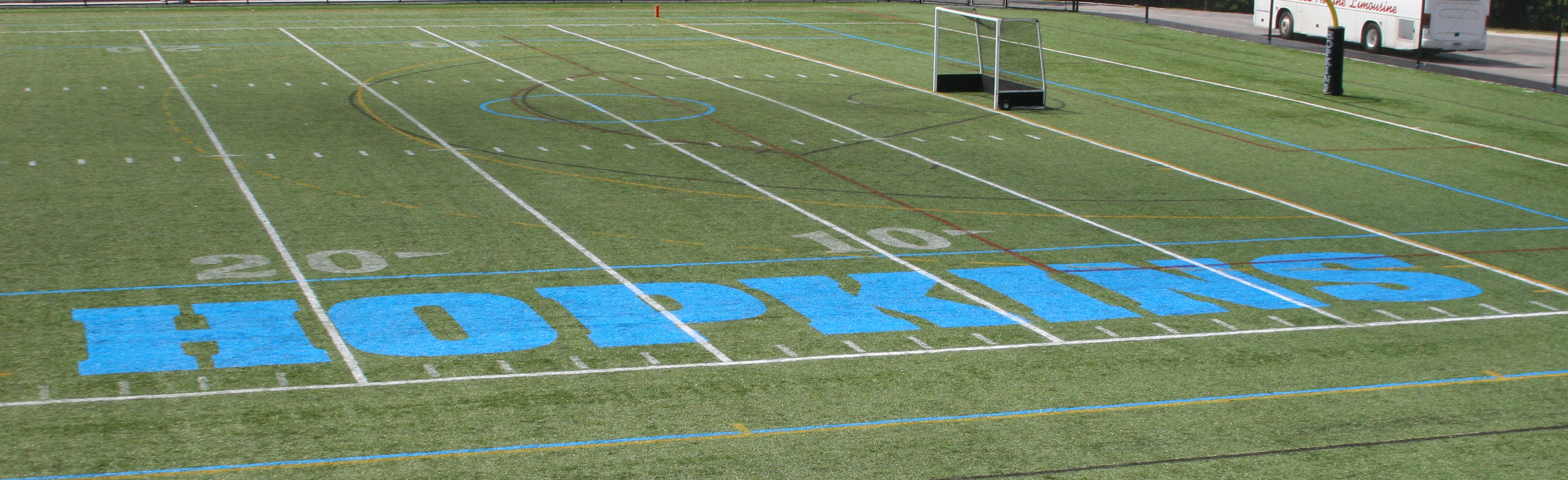
Homewood Field.

=== Cordish Lacrosse Center ===
Opened in 2012, the Cordish Lacrosse Center houses both the men's and women's lacrosse teams. The structure, which cost $10 million, was entirely funded by private investors, the largest of whom was former Johns Hopkins lacrosse player David Cordish. Cordish is viewed as both an asset to Johns Hopkins' lacrosse program as well as an asset to the recruitment process.

=== Shriver Hall ===
Shriver Hall, designed by the firm of Buckler, Fenhagen, Meyer and Ayers, was begun in September 1952 and completed in 1954. In 1939 Alfred Jenkins Shriver, a local lawyer who specialized in estates and testaments, left the university the residue of his estate to build a lecture hall. According to the conditions of the will, the building's walls were adorned with murals depicting the Hopkins class of 1891 (Shriver's class), ten philanthropists of Baltimore, ten famous beauties of Baltimore (as chosen by Shriver), the early Hopkins faculties of philosophy and medicine, the original Boards of Trustees of the university and Hospital, and Baltimore clipper ships. In addition, statues of President Daniel Coit Gilman and William H. Welch, first dean of the School of Medicine, flank the entrance to the building. There is also a bust of Isaiah Bowman in a niche under the porch. Shriver Hall closed for renovations in early-2018. After a $14 million renovation to bring the hall up to date, the auditorium reopened in February 2019. Shriver Hall is the home of the Hopkins Symphony, a community orchestra that is made up of students and members of the wider community, and Shriver Hall Concert Series, which presents classical chamber music and recitals featuring nationally and internationally recognized artists.

== See also ==
- List of Baltimore neighborhoods
- Wyman Park Building
