= Lawrence K. Altman =

American physician and journalist for The New York Times (born 1937)

- Born: June 19, 1937 (age 88); Quincy, Massachusetts, U.S.
- Education: Milton Academy; Harvard University; Tufts University School of Medicine
- Occupations: Physician, journalist
- Medical career
- Field: Internal medicine
- Institutions: The New York Times

Lawrence K. Altman (born June 19, 1937) is an American internal medicine physician and medical journalist who has worked for The New York Times since 1969, when he first became the paper's medical correspondent. He retired from his full-time position as medical correspondent in 2009, but continues to work for the Times.

Altman is particularly known for his journalistic coverage of the health of American presidents and presidential candidates, though during his career at the Times, he wrote many prominent articles about other topics, including his coverage of the 1976 Philadelphia Legionnaires' disease outbreak and the first article in a newspaper to break the story of the then-new disease of HIV/AIDS in 1981.

== Books ==
- Who Goes First? The Story of Self-Experimentation in Medicine (New York: Random House, 1987), 430 pp. ISBN 978-0520212817.
