= Hjalmars och Ramers saga =

The Hjalmars och Ramers saga is a forgery of a saga produced in Sweden at the end of the seventeenth century. It tells the story of King Hjalmar and his close friend (and later son-in-law) Ramer as they engage in various conflicts set in ancient Scandinavia.

== History of the text ==
The saga first appeared as a published dissertation which stated in an introduction that it was edited from parchment fragments found by the dissertation's author, Lucas Halpap. The text of the fragments was apparently written in runes, reproduced for the reader by Halpap along with a translation into Swedish. The language presented in the runes is similar to Old Norse but with a haphazard grammar and a vocabulary which at times is closer to early modern Swedish. The dissertation aroused the interest of a number of antiquarians, and the saga came to be edited on two more occasions within fifteen years of its appearance. While some scholars had doubts about its authenticity right from start, it finally came to be definitively exposed as a fake when Carl Gustav Nordin published a thesis on it in the late eighteenth century, showing how the saga contained borrowings from late seventeenth-century saga editions. While Halpap clearly played a role in the appearance of the forgery, there has been disagreement as to who was the intellectual author, although most agree that it stems from the circle of scholars close to Olof (or “Olaus”) Rudbeck (1630–1702) at Uppsala University (see below, Theories about Authorship).

== Synopsis ==
The saga begins with Hjalmar and Ramer setting out on an expedition from their home in Thulemark (probably roughly equivalent to modern-day Telemark). They go to Bjarmaland where the defeat King Wagmar. Hjalmar thus becomes king there and settles down, marrying Wagmar's daughter. They have two children together, a son named Tromi and a daughter named Heidil. Heidil attracts various suitors, first being abducted by a berserk and retrieved by Thor, after Hjalmar has prayed for his aid. Heidil is then married to Ramer, but another suitor, Ulfr, is unhappy about this. Ramer and Heidil leave to establish themselves on an island close to Thulemark. At this point the manuscript is damaged, but when the narrative is taken up once more Ulfr has attacked their home. Ramer manages to escape and returns to Hjalmar. Hjalmar and Ramer end up meeting Ulfr in a sea-battle, during which Hjalmar is killed and Ramer is captured. The story ends with Ulfr putting the pagan priests to flight, with them eventually seeking out the home of a man whom the narrator claims was his father.

== Editions and Manuscript ==
After Halpap's edition appeared in the form of his thesis in 1690, Sweden's Riksantikvarie (“State Antiquarian”) of the time, Johan Hadorph, was eager to see the manuscript which Halpap had based his edition on. Halpap had, however, travelled abroad for studies. It was only in 1694 that a manuscript appeared in Stockholm, by which time Hadorph had died. The new Riksantkvarie, Johan Peringskiöld, produced a new edition based on the manuscript, this time with a runic text, a transrunification and both a Swedish and Latin translation. No date appears in the edition, but it is believed be from 1701. The manuscript was eventually transferred to the Kungliga Bibliotek (“Royal Library”) in Stockholm, where it is still found today under the shelfmark V. r. 1a. Peringskiöld's edition also served as the basis for the text which appeared in 1703 in George Hickes' Linguarum vetterum septentrionalium thesaurus grammatico-criticus et archaeologicus.

== Theories about Authorship ==
Vilhelm Gödel, in his article on the matter, says that Halpap was probably too young and inexperienced to have produced the forgery on his own. Gödel thus says:

Jag må dock få säga, att man väl kan ha skäl att rikta sina misstankar mot den i många af sina uppgifter så otillförlitliga Lundius.

(I must however be permitted to say that there may well be reason to direct one's suspicions at Lundius, who in so many of his dealings was so untrustworthy.)

Carl Lundius (1638–1715) was a friend of Olof Rudbeck and thus shared many of the ideas associated with Rudbeckianism. Henrik Schück agreed with Gödel, pointing out that Lundius had written a thesis on Zalmoxis, a figure mentioned in Herodotus' Histories, whom Lundius believed had been the first lawmaker of the ancient Goths (i.e. the ancient inhabitants of Sweden and ancestors of the Swedes). Lundius' thesis, entitled “Zamolxis Primus Getarum Legislator”, had been published just three years prior to the appearance of Halpap's dissertation, namely in 1687. It connects to the manuscript which Halpap claims to have found, since a few lines of a story appear before the beginning of Hjalmars och Ramers saga there, and among those lines we find mentioned “samolis” who came from the Greeks (presumably intended to be the same as Zamolxis/Zalmoxis). On this basis, Schück says:

Inför dessa fakta synes det omöjligt att förneka Lundius' skuld, ty att fyndet just var avsett att styrka hans uppgifter om Zamolxis.

(Faced with these facts it seems impossible to deny Lundius' culpability, since the find was precisely calculated to strengthen his information about Zamolxis.)

Nils Ahnlund, however, speculated as to whether a forger named Nils Rabenius might have played a part in the creation of the saga:

[...] i episoden med den uppländske allmogemannen, som överlämnar manuskriptet till Halpap, erinrar icke så litet om Ullspegelsynnet hos den person, som åtminstone i två särskilda fall bevisligen använt Lundius som sin kanal.

([...] in the episode involving the common man from Uppland, who hands the manuscript over to Halpap, we are reminded in no small way of the picaresque nature of the person [i.e. Nils Rabenius] who on at least two occasions demonstrably used Lundius as an intermediary.)

== Editions ==
- Halpap, Lucas, Fragmentum mscr. runici... [or Hjalmars och Ramers saga] (Uppsala, 1690) Halpap's dissertation on baekur.is
- Hickes, George, Linguarum vetterum septentrionalium thesaurus grammatico-criticus et archaeologicus, vol. II (Oxford, 1703–05) [In the section Dissertatio epistolaries ad Bartholomeum Showere, pp. 123–47]
- Peringskiöld, Johan, Historia Hialmari Regis Biarmalandiæ atque Thulemarkiæ (Stockholm, 1701) Peringskiöld's edition on baekur.is
