= Felicity Barringer =

American journalist and writer

Felicity Barringer (born 1950, Philadelphia) is an American journalist. She is a writer in residence at Stanford University.

== Life ==
She graduated from Shipley School, and Stanford University. She wrote for The Bergen Record, and The Washington Post, From 1985 to 1988, she was Moscow correspondent for The New York Times. She was United Nations bureau chief She was environmental correspondent for the New York Times.

== Family ==
She married Phil Taubman.

== Works ==
- Flight From Sorrow, The Life and Death of Tamara Well Atheneum; 1984.
