= Armando Favazza =

American author and psychiatrist

Armando Favazza (born 1941 in Brooklyn, New York City) is an American author and psychiatrist best known for his studies of cultural psychiatry, deliberate self-harm, and religion. Favazza's Bodies Under Siege: Self-mutilation in Culture and Psychiatry (1987) was an early psychiatric book on this topic. His 2004 work, PsychoBible: Behavior, Religion, and the Holy Book presents objective data regarding commonly held misconceptions about the Bible as a whole as well as its major passages. In Kaplan and Sadock's Comprehensive Textbook of Psychiatry he has written the chapter on "Anthropology and Psychiatry" in the 3rd edition (1980), the 4th edition (1985) and the 8th edition (2005), as well as the chapter on "Spirituality and Psychiatry" in the 9th edition (2009). He has published two cover articles in the American Journal of Psychiatry: "Foundations of Cultural Psychiatry" [135:293-303,1978] and "Modern Christian Healing of Mental Illness" [139:728-735,1982]. In 1979 he co-founded The Society for the Study of Culture and Psychiatry.

== Biography ==
Armando Favazza was born in 1941. he grew up in Brooklyn, New York City, and attended Columbia University. He studied medicine at the University of Virginia and completed a psychiatry residency program at the University of Michigan. In the 1970s, he became editor of the Journal of Operational Psychiatry. He is an emeritus professor in the Department of Psychiatry at the University of Missouri.

== Fields of work ==
=== Cultural psychiatry ===
His cover article, "The Foundation of Cultural Psychiatry", in the American Journal of Psychiatry (1978) presented a framework for a new discipline merging cultural anthropology with clinical psychiatry. Cultural psychiatry is an approach that synthesizes the biological, psychological, and social forces that impinge upon behavior, and explains their interactions through a cultural lens to therapeutically benefit individuals or groups affected by death, disease, and disorganization. Upon the death of his former teacher, Margaret Mead, he took her place as the author of the chapter on Psychiatry and Anthropology in the third edition of The Comprehensive Textbook of Psychiatry (1980). He has written updated chapters for editions in 1985 and 2005. He was elected the American representative on the executive board of the Transcultural Psychiatry Section of the World Psychiatric Association for nine years. He is on the editorial board of the World Association of Cultural Psychiatry Research Review.

=== Deliberate self-harm ===
His 1987 book, Bodies Under Siege: Self-mutilation in Culture and Psychiatry, a psychiatric book on the topic of self-harm, according to Jennifer Egan in The New York Times, was "the first to comprehensively explore self-mutilation". The second edition (1996), subtitled Self-Mutilation and Body Modification in Culture and Psychiatry, has been called the "seminal book on NSSI" (nonsuicidal self-injury). He describes deliberate self-injury as a morbid form of self-help, temporarily alleviating distressing symptoms, and, attempting to heal themselves, to attain some measure of spirituality, and to establish a sense of personal order. He helped to teach clinicians that self-injurious behavior totally differs from suicidal behavior. However, repetitive skin-cutters may develop a Deliberate Self-Harm syndrome which includes demoralization and a tendency to overdose. The “secret shame” website contains a supervised Bodies Under Siege bulletin board that allows self-injurers to communicate with one another. Collaborators with Favazza on his publications in this area include Karen Conterio, Daphne Simeon, and Richard Rosenthal.

=== Religion ===
His book PsychoBible|PsychoBible: Behavior, Religion, and the Holy Book was published in 2004. After an overview of the Bible's contents as well as the process that leads to the Bible's creation, the book includes chapters on God, the devil, sin, women, alcohol, animals, the human body, spirituality, and healing. Favazza presents data on the Bible, on how Christians and Jews over the centuries have interpreted these data, and how psychiatry regards them. The book points to Biblical material that has been validated by scholars as well as material that requires faith.

== Books ==
- Bodies Under Siege: Self-mutilation, Nonsuicidal Self-injury, and Body Modification in Culture and Psychiatry, Third edition (2011). ISBN 0-8018-9966-4, ISBN 978-0-8018-9966-9 (pbk)
- Bodies Under Siege: Self-mutilation and Body Modification in Culture and Psychiatry (1987, 1996). ISBN 0-8018-5299-4, ISBN 0-8018-5300-1 (pbk)
- PsychoBible: Behavior, Religion and the Holy Book (2004). ISBN 0-9728875-0-4, ISBN 0-9728875-1-2 (pbk)
- Themes in Cultural Psychiatry: An Annotated Bibliography, 1975-1980, with Ahmed D. Faheem (1982). ISBN 0-8262-0377-9 (hardcover)
- Anthropological and Cross-Cultural Themes in Mental Health: An Annotated Bibliography, 1975-1980, with Mary Oman (1977). ISBN 0-8262-0215-2 (hardcover)
