= Alfred Jenkins Shriver =

American lawyer

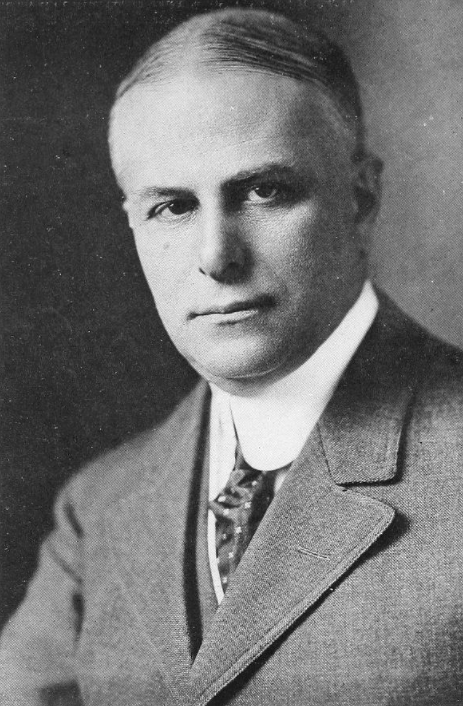
- Born: June 5, 1867; Baltimore, Maryland
- Died: September 3, 1939 (aged 72); Atlantic City, New Jersey
- Education: Johns Hopkins University; University of Maryland
- Occupation: Lawyer

Alfred Jenkins Shriver (June 5, 1867 – September 3, 1939) was an American lawyer and philanthropist.

== Biography ==
Alfred Jenkins Shriver was born in Baltimore, Maryland on June 5, 1867, of parents who both traced their lineage to colonial days and earlier. He attended private schools before enrolling in Johns Hopkins University in 1887. He graduated with a Bachelor of Arts degree in 1891 and was inducted into Phi Beta Kappa. He took one year of graduate study at Hopkins then enrolled in law school at the University of Maryland, earning his law degree in 1893. His law practice favored contested wills and estates, which brought him wealth and social prominence. He also wrote several legal text books, including Law of Wills and Personal Property in Maryland.

Although he never married, one of his hobbies was planning formal dinner parties down to the last detail. He enjoyed traveling and was in England at the outbreak of World War I, but he returned to the United States without incident.

Following surgery, he spent the summer of 1939 convalescing in Atlantic City, New Jersey. After another operation, his health declined rapidly and he died on September 3, 1939.

He was a strong supporter of Johns Hopkins University, helping to found the University Club on Hopkins' Homewood Campus, and staying active in other local clubs and organizations. Shortly before his death, he published his will, in which he left the bulk of his estate to Hopkins specifically to fund an auditorium building on campus. This will has been referred to as "one of the most remarkable documents of our time." Along with the money, he left several specific instructions for art to appear in the building. The most notorious of these conditions specified that a mural was to be placed in the lobby depicting ten women, Shriver's contemporaries from Baltimore society. He named this painting the "Famous Beauties of Baltimore," and he further specified that each of the ten women was to be depicted "at the height of her beauty." If the University trustees did not accept these conditions, the bequest would then be offered to two other local colleges.

== Legacy ==
The Hopkins trustees did accept the conditions, but World War II postponed planning and construction and it was not until 1952 that construction began. By 1956, all of the murals were in place and the building was in use. The "Famous Beauties" mural has attracted comment and raised eyebrows on many occasions since then, as those unfamiliar with Shriver and his bequest wonder how a mural featuring ten late 19th century women, none of whom had any affiliation with Johns Hopkins University, is relevant in a campus building.

In 2019, the lobby murals were carefully removed and placed in storage.
