= List of people who worked for Thomas Edison =

The following is a list of people who worked for Thomas Edison.

- Edward Goodrich Acheson – chemist, worked at Menlo Park 1880–1884
- William Symes Andrews – started at the Menlo Park machine shop 1879
- Charles Batchelor – "chief experimental assistant"
- John I. Beggs – manager of Edison Illuminating Company in New York, 1886
- William Kennedy Dickson – joined Menlo Park in 1883, worked on the motion picture camera
- Justus B. Entz – joined Edison Machine Works in 1887
- Reginald Fessenden – worked at the Edison Machine Works in 1886
- Henry Ford – engineer Edison Illuminating Company Detroit, Michigan, 1891–1899
- William Joseph Hammer – started as laboratory assistant Menlo Park in 1879
- Miller Reese Hutchison – inventor of hearing aid
- Edward Hibberd Johnson – started in 1909, chief engineer at West Orange laboratory 1912–1918
- Samuel Insull – started in 1881, rose to become VP of General Electric (1892) then President of Chicago Edison
- Kunihiko Iwadare – joined Edison Machine Works in 1887
- Francis Jehl – laboratory assistant Menlo Park 1879–1882
- Arthur E. Kennelly – engineer, experimentalist at West Orange laboratory 1887–1894
- John Kruesi – started 1872, was head machinist, at Newark, Menlo Park, Edison Machine Works
- Lewis Howard Latimer – hired 1884 as a draftsman, continued working for General Electric
- John W. Lieb – worked at the Edison Machine Works in 1881
- Thomas Commerford Martin – electrical engineer, worked at Menlo Park 1877–1879
- George F. Morrison – started at Edison Lamp Works 1882
- Edwin Stanton Porter – joined the Edison Manufacturing Company 1899
- Frank J. Sprague – joined Menlo Park 1883, became known as the "Father of Electric Traction".
- Nikola Tesla – electrical engineer and inventor, worked at the Edison Machine Works in 1884
- Francis Robbins Upton – mathematician/physicist, joined Menlo Park 1878
- Theo Wangemann – personal assistant to Edison
- John Birkinbine - mining technician that developed re-refining technique in 1889
- Alfred O'Tate
- Norman Raff
- Frank Gammon
- Andrew and Edwin Holland, brothers

== Bibliography ==
- Baldwin, Neil (1995). Edison: Inventing the Century. Hyperion. ISBN 978-0-226-03571-0.
- Morris, Edmund (October 22, 2019). Edison. Random House.
- Bradley, Robert L Jr (2011). Edison to Enron. John Wiley & Sons. ISBN 978-1-118-19251-1. Archived from the original on May 11, 2021.
