= Louis Rau =

- Born: Ludwig Louis Rau; 12 December 1841; Munich, Kingdom of Bavaria
- Died: 27 April 1923 (aged 81); Paris, France
- Citizenship: French (naturalized 1867)
- Occupations: Industrialist, electricity pioneer
- Awards: Knight of the Légion d'honneur (1888)

Ludwig (known as Louis) Rau (Munich, 12 December 1841 – Paris, 27 April 1923) was a Franco-Bavarian industrialist and pioneering figure of the European electrical industry. Founder and president of the Compagnie Continentale Edison, he is one of seven men named by Electrical World magazine in 1924 as having emerged "from Edison's workshop" to "rise to high places in the industrial engineering world" — alongside Emil Rathenau (founder of AEG), Samuel Insull and Sigmund Bergmann.

== Biography ==
=== Youth and arrival in Paris (1841–1867) ===
Born in Munich on 12 December 1841, Louis Rau was the son of Salomon Gabriel Rau, a Munich banker, and Cecilia Wertheimer. He arrived in Paris in January 1861, aged nineteen, as a clerk in a stockbroker's office on the rue Taitbout, brought over by one of his brothers already established in the same firm. He obtained his certificate of domicile on 9 August 1864, then French naturalization on 13 November 1867 by decree of Napoleon III.

=== Franco-Prussian War (1870–1871) ===
During the siege of Paris, Rau served in the 2nd company of the 9th wartime battalion of the Seine National Guard. He was cited in the battalion order of the day for his conduct at the Battle of Buzenval (19 January 1871).

=== Founder of the Edison empire in France (1881–1892) ===
In 1881, Thomas Edison sought to deploy his electric lighting system across Europe. Louis Rau was among the founding board of directors of the Compagnie Continentale Edison, incorporated on 2 February 1882 before notaries Baudrier and Mégret in Paris, alongside Charles Batchelor, Élie Léon, Charles Porges and other founding directors.

He oversaw the establishment of a lamp factory and machine shop at Ivry-sur-Seine (45 rue du Parc), which employed up to 400 workers. The 1917 London biography of Edison describes him as "the founder of the Edison Company in France" and names him among the visitors to Menlo Park "destined later to carry Edison's processes to nearly every country on the globe", alongside Rathenau (Germany), Colombo (Italy) and Fodor (Hungary).

He became chairman of the board on 1 January 1884 and simultaneously directed three entities: the Compagnie Continentale Edison, the Société Électrique Edison and the Société Industrielle et Commerciale Edison.

In October 1883, he sent Edison an early warning about the dangers of alternating current competition, writing that "the Edison system was meeting a tremendous competition" and had been left "entirely by the side" by "alternating currents with transformers".

==== Nikola Tesla in Paris ====
In 1882–1884, Nikola Tesla was employed at the Ivry-sur-Seine works. Between his troubleshooting assignments in France and Germany, Tesla developed an automatic regulator for Edison dynamos. His design impressed Louis Rau, leading the company to select Tesla in October 1883 as the expert to resolve wiring problems at the new electric lighting station at Strasbourg in Alsace.

==== The 1889 Universal Exposition ====
On 15 February 1888, Rau co-signed on behalf of the International Syndicate of Electricians an agreement with the French Minister of Commerce and Industry to provide electric lighting for the 1889 Paris Universal Exposition. The syndicate secured the monopoly on electric lighting across 300,000 square metres — the largest electrical installation ever undertaken at that time.

In July 1888, Rau also coordinated the Edison Lamp Factory's contribution to the Edison pavilion, requesting from Francis Robbins Upton detailed plans for the celebrated Lamp Tower — the towering column of incandescent lamps that became the iconic centrepiece of the Edison display in 1889.

On 12 August 1889, Rau personally welcomed Thomas Edison at the Gare Saint-Lazare on his arrival in Paris for the Exposition.

=== Légion d'honneur (1888) ===
By decree of 27 December 1888, Louis Rau was appointed knight of the Légion d'honneur, on the recommendation of the Minister of Commerce and Industry. The investiture took place on 13 February 1889, conducted by Éleuthère Mascart, member of the Institut de France, professor at the Collège de France. The Jewish periodical L'Univers Israélite hailed him as the "genuine populariser in France of electric lighting of this system".

=== Personal life ===
On 17 June 1872, he married in Paris Nellie Wallerstein (New York, 14 December 1850 – Paris, 4 February 1923), who died three months before him. His sister Elisabeth Rau married the Parisian jeweller Adolphe Grünberg, of whom he became brother-in-law and, following Grünberg's early death in 1878, the de facto guardian of his six children.

=== Death ===
Louis Rau died on 27 April 1923 at his residence at 186 avenue Victor-Hugo, Paris 16th arrondissement. His death certificate describes him as a rentier (man of independent means). He was the last survivor of the three European Edison pioneers cited in Electrical World: Sigmund Schuckert had died in 1895, Emil Rathenau in 1915.

== Legacy ==
In 1924, one year after his death, Electrical World published in its fiftieth-anniversary issue a list of "Edison's Famous Graduates" — seven men who had emerged from Edison's workshops to become major figures of the global electrical engineering world. Louis Rau appears alongside Sigmund Bergmann, Sigmund Schuckert, Emil Rathenau, John W. Lieb, Samuel Insull and Charles L. Edgar. The entry notes laconically: "Schuckert, Rau and Rathenau are dead."

== See also ==
- Thomas Edison
- Continental Edison
- Nikola Tesla
- Emil Rathenau
- Samuel Insull
- Sigmund Bergmann
- Charles Batchelor
- Exposition Universelle (1889)
- Légion d'honneur
- Hippolyte Fontaine
