= Edison Pioneers =

Employee organization

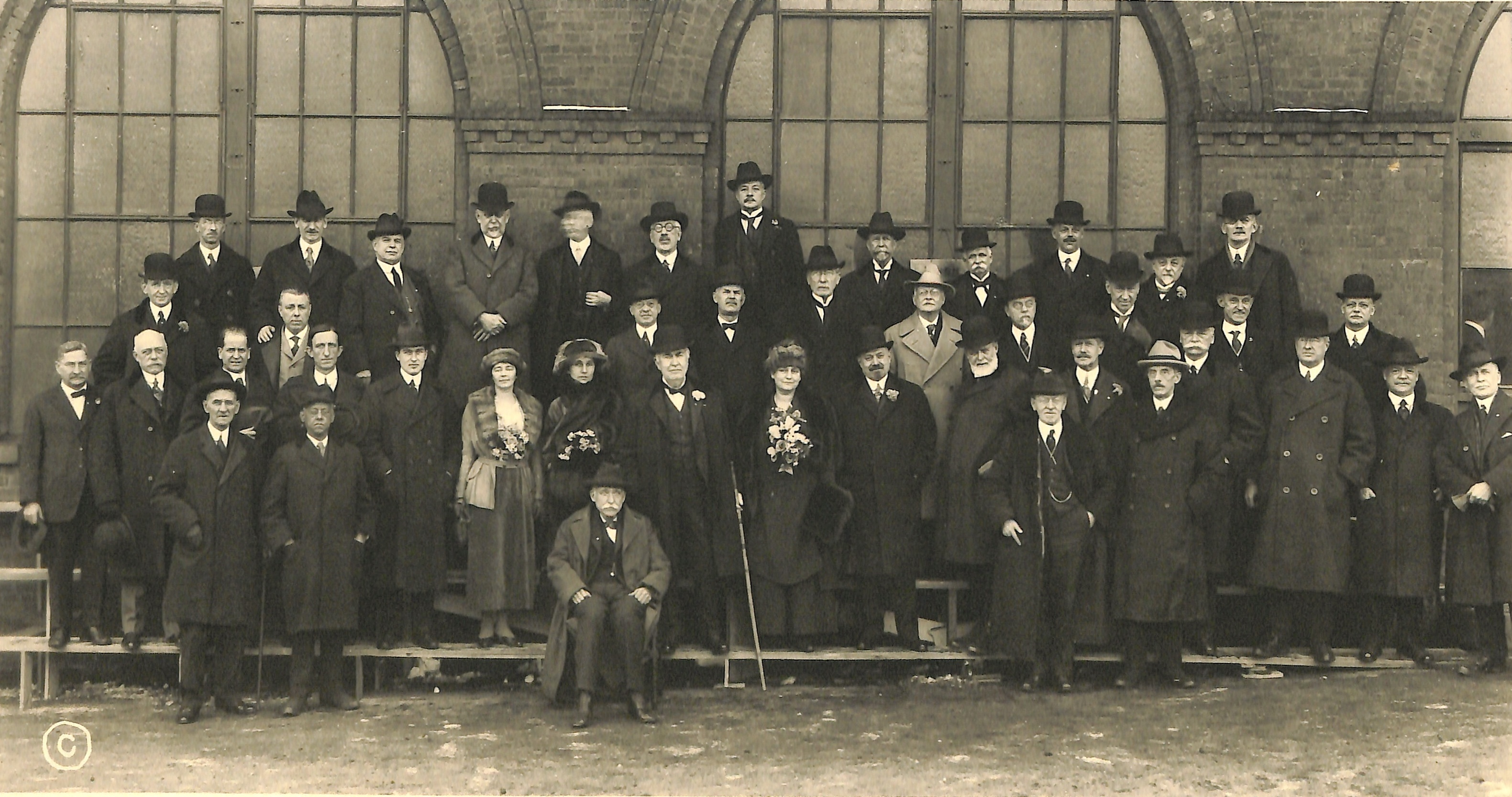
1920 meeting with Edison (standing with cane)

The Edison Pioneers was an organization composed of former employees of Thomas Edison who had worked with the inventor in his early years. Membership was limited to people who had worked closely with Edison before 1885. On February 11, 1918, the Edison Pioneers met for the first time, on the 71st birthday of Edison. There were 37 people at the first meeting. Edison himself was not present; it was announced he was "engaged in important government service". It was suspected he was working on a military project since World War I was still in progress. The organization had 100 members although in later years descendants of Edison Pioneers were also allowed membership.

== Members ==
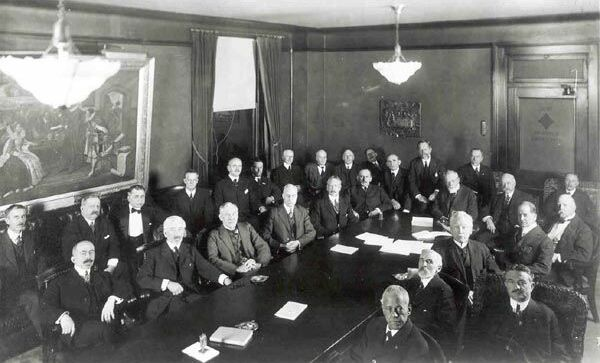
Founding meeting in 1918

Members of the Edison Pioneers:

- Edward Goodrich Acheson (1856–1931)
- William Symes Andrews (1847–1929)
- John I. Beggs (1847–1925)
- C. A. Benton
- Sigmund Bergmann
- Charles S. Bradley
- James Burke (1873–1940)*
- Charles Lorenzo Clarke (1853–1941)
- George V. Delany (died 1933)
- John V. N. Dorr
- Charles L Edgar
- Charles L. Eidlitz (1866–1951), business executive
- William E. Gilmore
- Edwin T. Greenfield
- William Joseph Hammer
- John White Howell
- Samuel Insull (1859–1938)
- Francis Jehl
- Oscar Junggren
- Alfred W Kiddle
- Isaac Krall
- Lewis Howard Latimer
- Thomas Commerford Martin (1856–1924)
- George F. Morrison (1867–1943), Vice President of General Electric Company
- H. W. Nelson
- Frederic Nicholls
- John G Ott
- Henry V.A. Parsell (1868–1962)
- Charles E. Pattison
- Charles R. Price
- Louis Rau
- Frederick Sargent
- Frederick A. Scheffler
- Elmer Ambrose Sperry (1860–1930)
- Francis Robbins Upton, first president
- Theodore Vandeventer
- Montgomery Waddell
- Schuyler Skaats Wheeler
- Edwin R. Weeks
- Charles Wirt
