= Edison laboratory =

Edison laboratory or laboratories refers to one of American inventor and businessman Thomas Edison's labs:

- the original Menlo Park, New Jersey laboratory, now:
  - memorialized as Thomas Alva Edison Memorial Tower and Museum
    - at Edison State Park, located in the Menlo Park section of Edison, New Jersey
  - relocated and preserved at Greenfield Village in Michigan
- the West Orange, New Jersey laboratories, now preserved as Thomas Edison National Historical Park

== See also ==
- General Electric Research Laboratory, the first industrial research facility in the United States
