= Edward Goodrich Acheson =

American chemist (1856–1931)

Edward G. Acheson
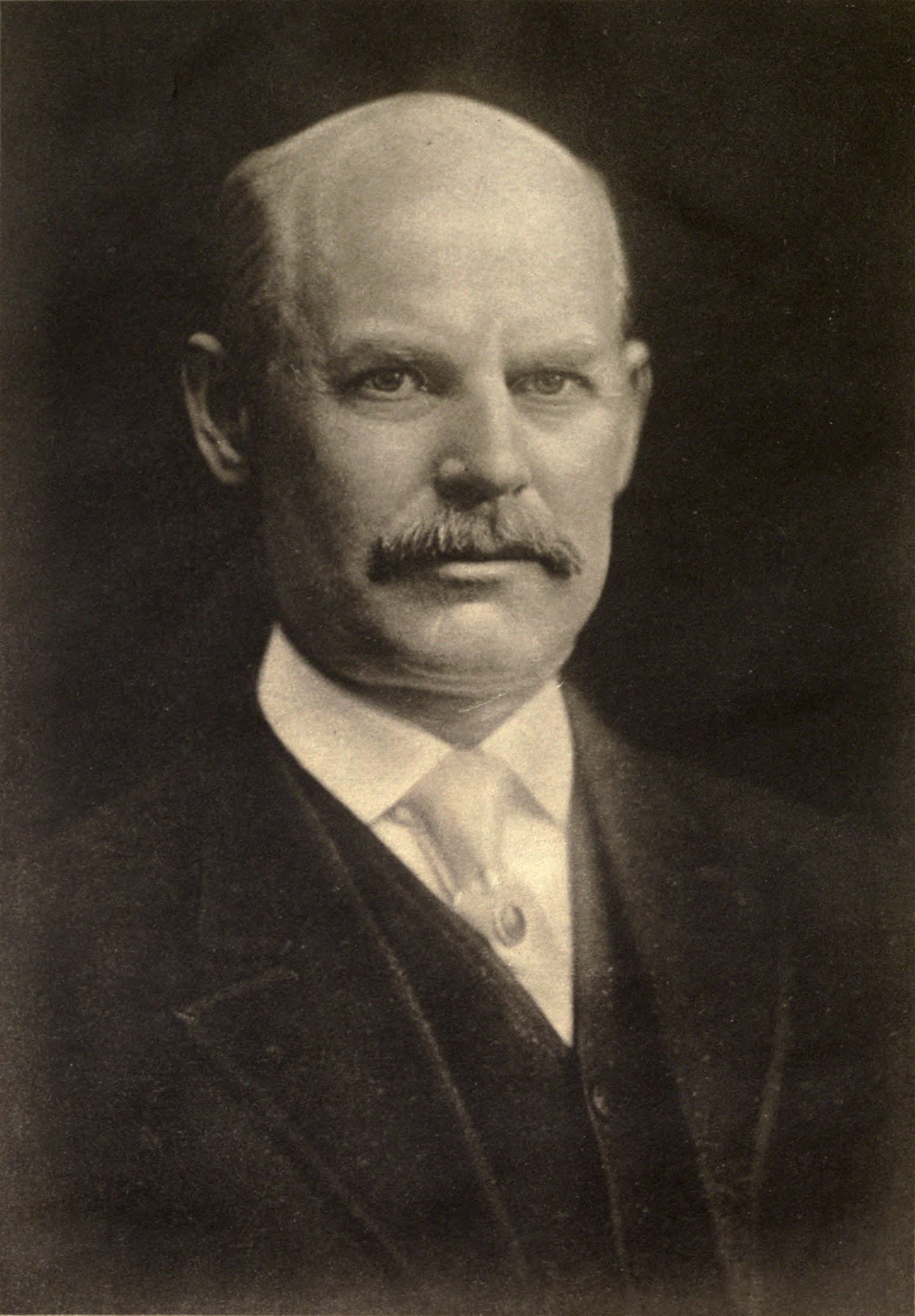
- Born: March 9, 1856; Washington, Pennsylvania, US
- Died: July 6, 1931 (aged 75); New York City, US
- Known for: silicon carbide
- Awards: John Scott Medal (1894); John Scott Medal (1901); Perkin Medal (1910); Edward Goodrich Acheson Award (1929)

Edward Goodrich Acheson (March 9, 1856 – July 6, 1931) was an American chemist. Born in Washington, Pennsylvania, he was the inventor of the Acheson process, which is still used to make silicon carbide (carborundum). Acheson founded the Carborundum Company in 1891 and became a manufacturer of carborundum and synthetic graphite.

== Biography ==
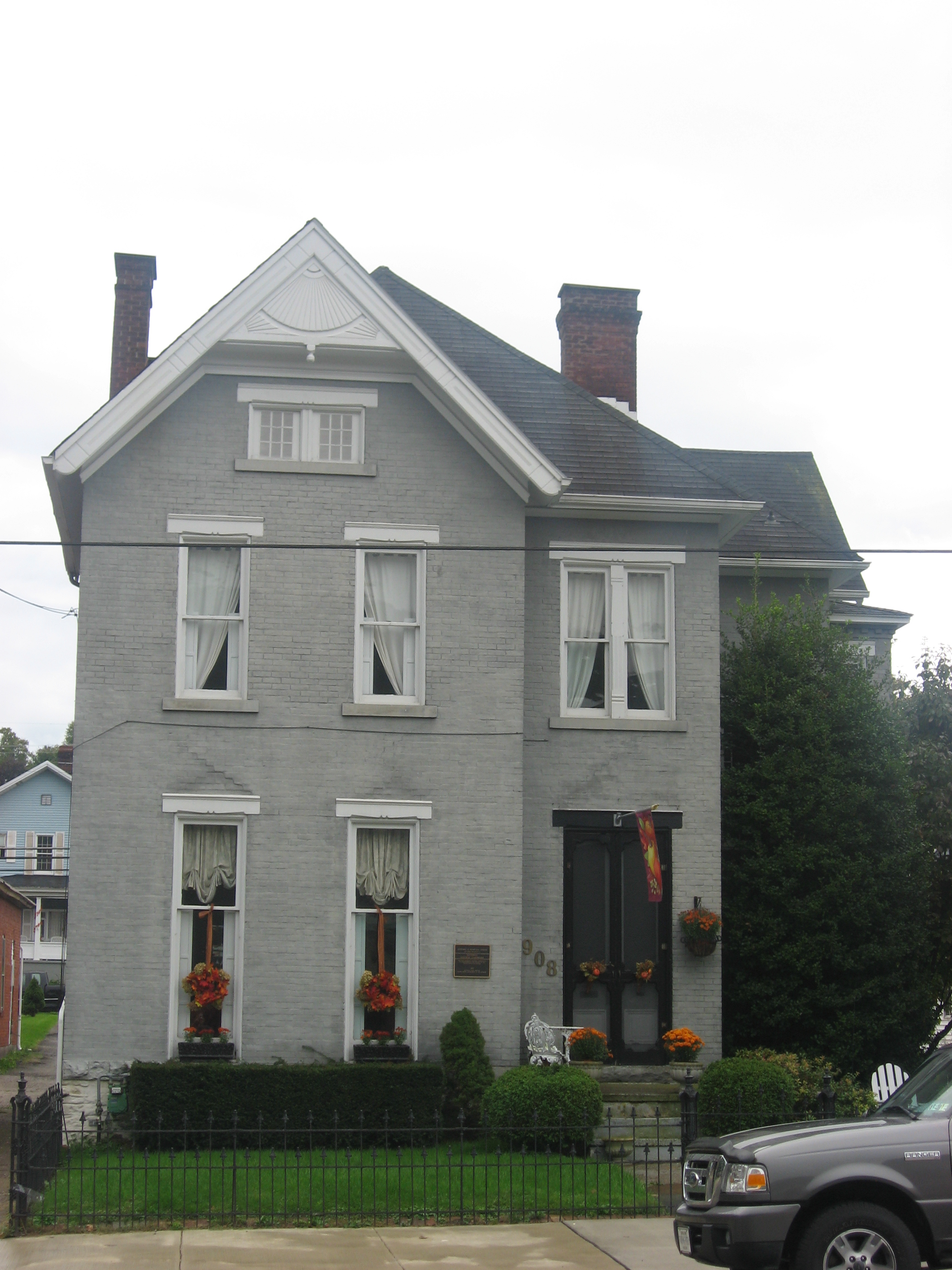
Edward G. Acheson House in Monongahela, Pennsylvania

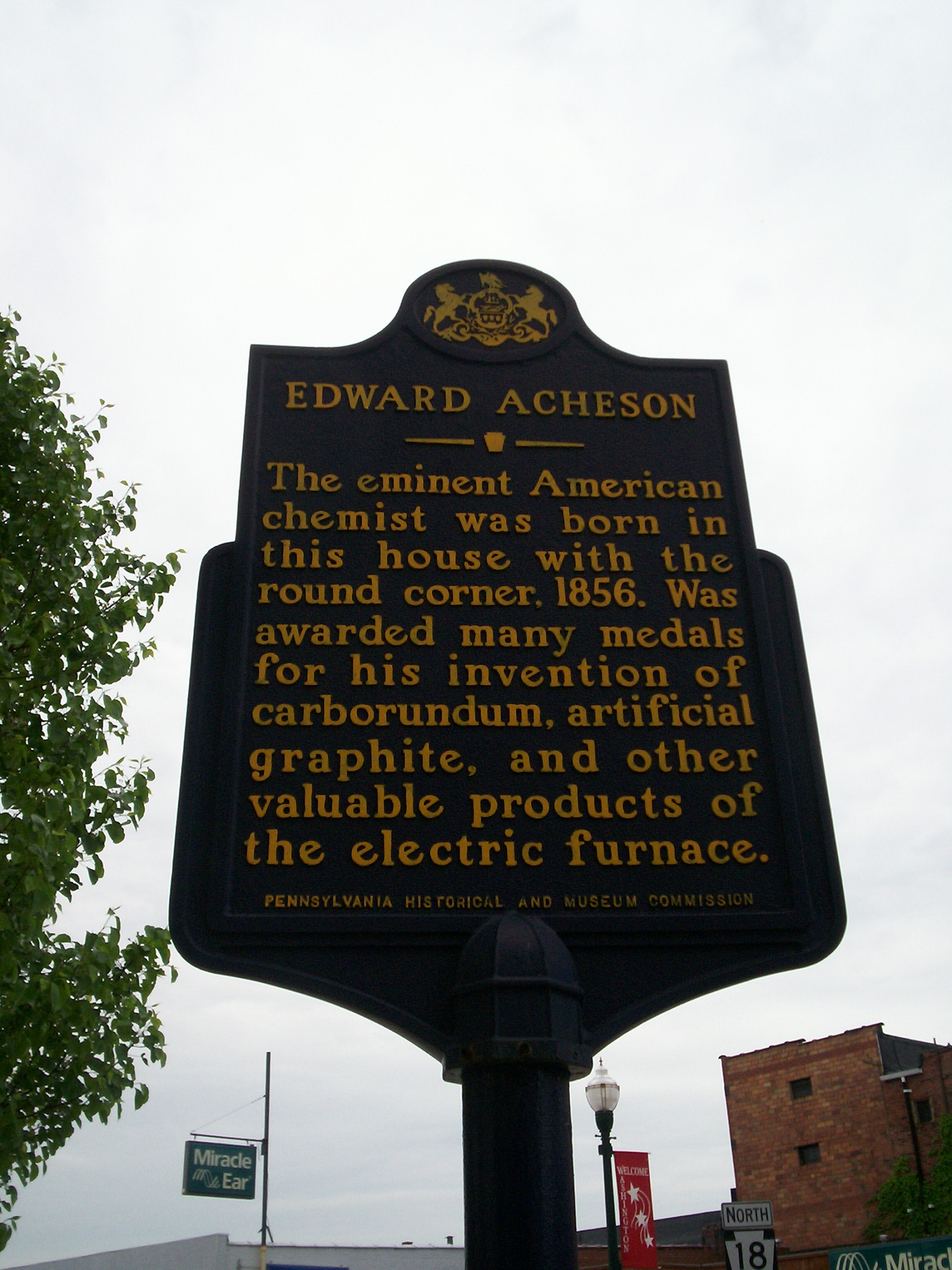
Historical marker for the birthplace of Edward Acheson in Washington, Pennsylvania

Acheson (1856–1931) was raised in the coal fields of southwestern Pennsylvania. Acheson attended the Bellefonte Academy for three years, 1870–72; this being the totality of his formal education. He left school at the age of 16 to help support his family after his father died, and worked as a surveying assistant for the Pittsburgh Southern Railroad.

He devoted his evenings to scientific pursuits—primarily electrical experiments. In 1880, he had the temerity to attempt to sell a battery of his own invention to Thomas Edison and wound up being hired. Edison put him to work on September 12, 1880, at his Menlo Park, New Jersey laboratory under John Kruesi. Acheson experimented on making a conducting carbon that Edison could use in his electric light bulbs.

In 1881, he was sent to the International Exposition of Electricity in Paris, as part of the team led by Charles Batchelor, and he remained in Europe in 1882 to install demonstrations of the Edison system of electrical lighting in Antwerp City Hall in Belgium and in La Scala in Milan, among other public places.

In 1884, Acheson left Edison and became supervisor at a plant competing to manufacture electric lamps. He began working on the development of methods to produce artificial diamond in an electric furnace. After heating a mixture of clay and coke in an iron bowl with a carbon arc light he found shiny, hexagonal crystals (silicon carbide) attached to the carbon electrode. He called it carborundum.

In 1891, Acheson built an electricity plant in Port Huron, Michigan, at the suggestion of Edison and used the electricity to experiment with carborundum. That year he founded the Carborundum Company, utilizing a dynamo of 135 hp.

The first commercial plant using the Acheson process was built by Acheson in Niagara Falls, New York, where hydroelectric plants nearby could cheaply produce the necessary power for the energy intensive process. Its dynamo produced 1000 hp. By 1896, The Carborundum Company was manufacturing 1 million pounds of carborundum.

Acheson was forced out of his own company in 1901. By 1910 its dynamos were generating 10,000 hp of electricity and producing ten million pounds of silicon carbide per year. Twenty years later it was “supplying the world with enough silicon carbide to influence the entire metallurgical, stone, abrasive paper, leather, jewelry, rice, and high temperature electrical heating element industries.”

Acheson had received a patent on his method of producing Carborundum on February 28, 1893, although a 1900 decision gave "priority broadly" to the Electric Smelting and Aluminum Company "for reducing ores and other substances by the incandescent method".

Acheson received 70 patents relating to abrasives, graphite products, reduction of oxides, and refractories. He was awarded the first Acheson Award, named in his honour, by the Electrochemical Society in 1931.

He died on July 6, 1931, in New York City.

=== Recognition ===
In 1953, the Pennsylvania Historical and Museum Commission installed a historical marker outside his home, noting the historic importance of his achievements. In 1997, Acheson was inducted into the National Inventors Hall of Fame. His house, the Edward G. Acheson House in Monongahela, Pennsylvania is a National Historic Landmark.

As one of The Electrochemical Society's most prestigious members, the organization presents an award in his name every two years to distinguish contributions to the advancement of any of the objects, purposes, or activities of the Society.
