= Edward G. Acheson House =

Historic house in Pennsylvania, United States

- U.S. National Register of Historic Places
- U.S. National Historic Landmark
- Pennsylvania state historical marker
- Washington County History & Landmarks Foundation Landmark
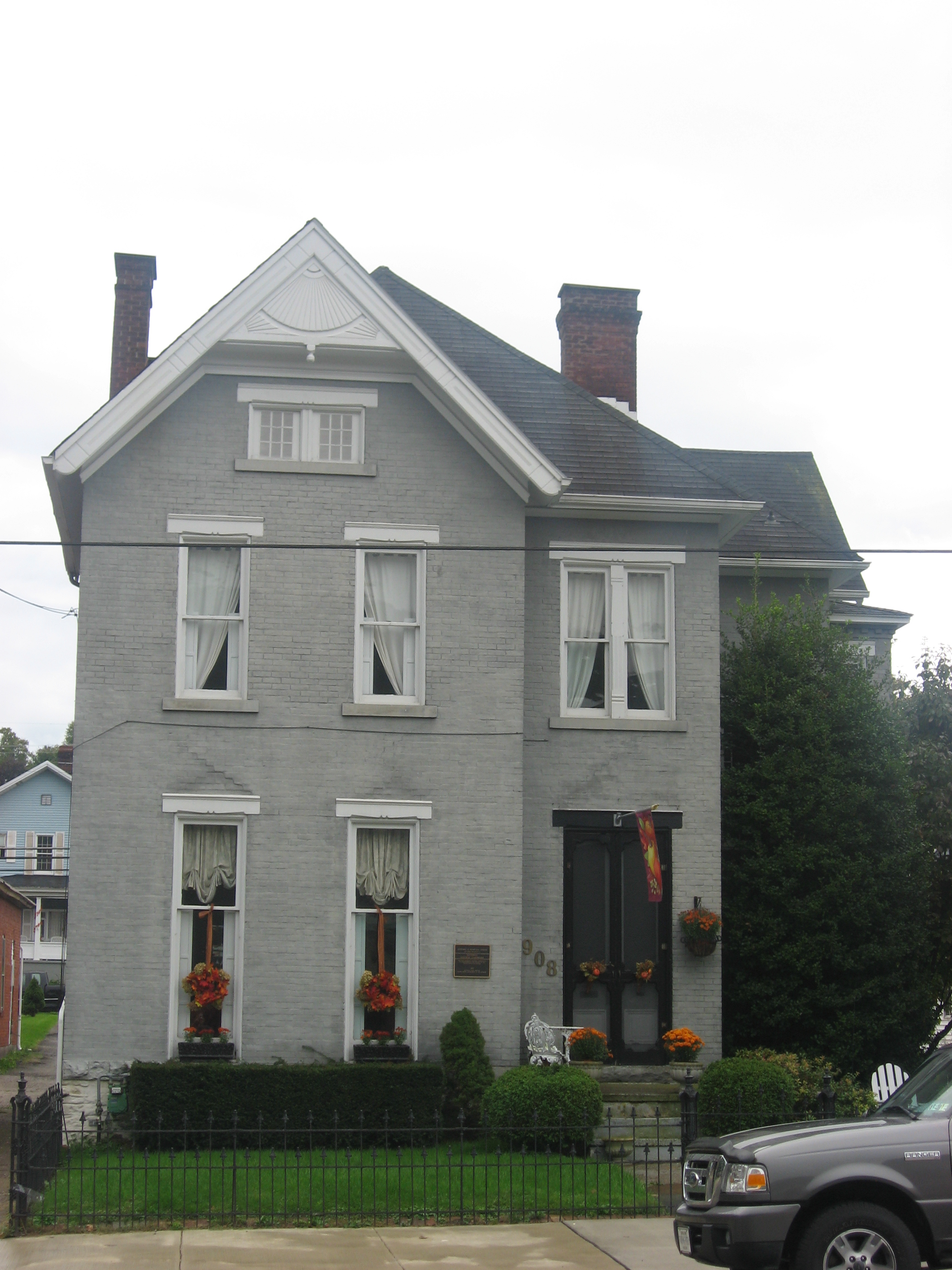
- Edward G. Acheson House in 2011

- Location within Pennsylvania Location within the United States
- Location: 908 West Main St., Monongahela, Pennsylvania
- Coordinates: 40°12′18.94″N 79°55′59.38″W
- Area: less than one acre
- Built: c. 1870
- NRHP reference No.: 76001679

Significant dates
- Added to NRHP: May 11, 1976
- Designated NHL: May 11, 1976
- Designated PHMC: August 01, 1953

The Edward G. Acheson House is a historic house at 908 West Main St. in Monongahela, Washington County, Pennsylvania, United States. Probably built about 1870, it is notable as the home of Edward G. Acheson (1856-1931), the inventor of carborundum, and as the likely site of its invention. It was designated a National Historic Landmark in 1976.

== Description and history ==
The Edward G. Acheson House is located west of Monongahela's town center, on the south side of West Main Street roughly midway between 9th and 10th Streets. It is a vernacular 2 1/2-story painted brick building that is not architecturally distinguished. It is roughly L-shaped and covered by a hip roof, with a two-bay gabled projection in front. Its builder and construction date are not known; its styling is suggestive of a c. 1870s construction date.

Between 1890 and 1895 the house was the home of inventor Edward G. Acheson (1856–1931). Acheson, a native of nearby Washington, was a minimally educated, but in 1880 landed a job at the laboratory of Thomas Edison. After being involved in the installation of electricity infrastructure for Edison, he settled in 1890 in Monongahela, where he worked for the local electric utility, and used excess capacity to perform experiments at his home. A series of experiments in 1891 led to invention of carborundum, the name he gave silicon carbide. According to local lore, the experiments were probably conducted in a summer kitchen attached to the back of the house. He moved to Niagara Falls, New York in 1895, to take advantage of the large power station there to develop carborundum production on an industrial scale. He received international recognition for his invention.

Carborunudum is a mixture of clay and powdered coke, fused by electric current. It was then—and for fifty years remained—the hardest known artificial substance in the world. It has been used in countless industrial processes, primarily as an abrasive, over the years. Acheson's achievements are all the more remarkable in that he was self-educated and worked independently."

In 1953, the Pennsylvania Historical and Museum Commission installed a historical marker outside the house, noting the historic importance of Acheson's achievements. It was declared a National Historic Landmark in 1976. It is designated as a historic residential landmark/farmstead by the Washington County History & Landmarks Foundation.

== See also ==
- List of National Historic Landmarks in Pennsylvania
- National Register of Historic Places listings in Washington County, Pennsylvania
