= Edison Machine Works =

Former manufacturing company owned by Thomas Edison

Coordinates: 40°42′58″N 73°58′40″W

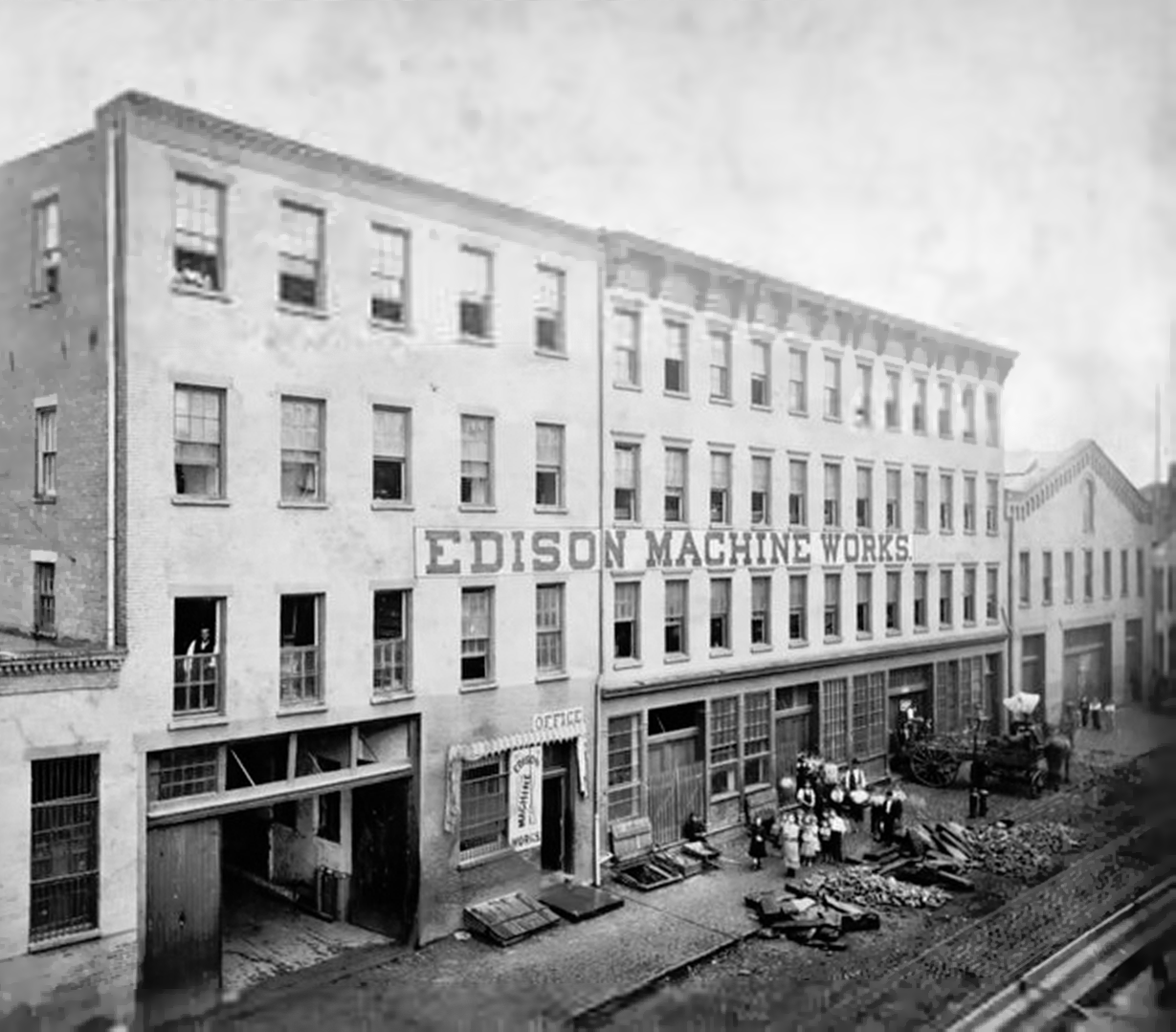
Edison Machine Works on Goerck Street on the Lower East Side of Manhattan, photographed by Edison employee Charles L. Clarke

The Edison Machine Works was a manufacturing company set up to produce dynamos, large electric motors, and other components of the electrical illumination system being built in the 1880s by Thomas A. Edison in New York City. In 1892, its Schenectady, New York, plant would become General Electric.

== History ==
The need for equipment in the development of a large-scale electric illumination "utility" in New York City, starting around 1880, soon outstripped the capacity of Thomas Edison's machine shop at Menlo Park. To alleviate the problem in 1881 Edison leased the old Etna Iron Works at 104 Goerck Street, Lower Manhattan and set up the Edison Machine Works with Edison providing 90% of the capital and investor partner Charles Batchelor providing 10%. The workforce built up to some 800 men supervised by Edison machinist Charles Dean. This shop supplied jumbo dynamos for the original Pearl Street Station as well as dynamos of various sizes for the different types of electric light installations Edison was offering customers. The Machine Works was incorporated in 1884 with Edison investor Charles Batchelor as general manager, John Kruesi as assistant general manager, and Samuel Insull as secretary. At the end of 1885 the Electric Tube Company and the Edison Shafting Manufacturing Company were merged into the Edison Machine Works.

The Machine Works also had a department that designed and tested equipment and trained Edison workers how to wire buildings and install and repair dynamos. New types of dynamos were designed here as well as improved power consumption meters.

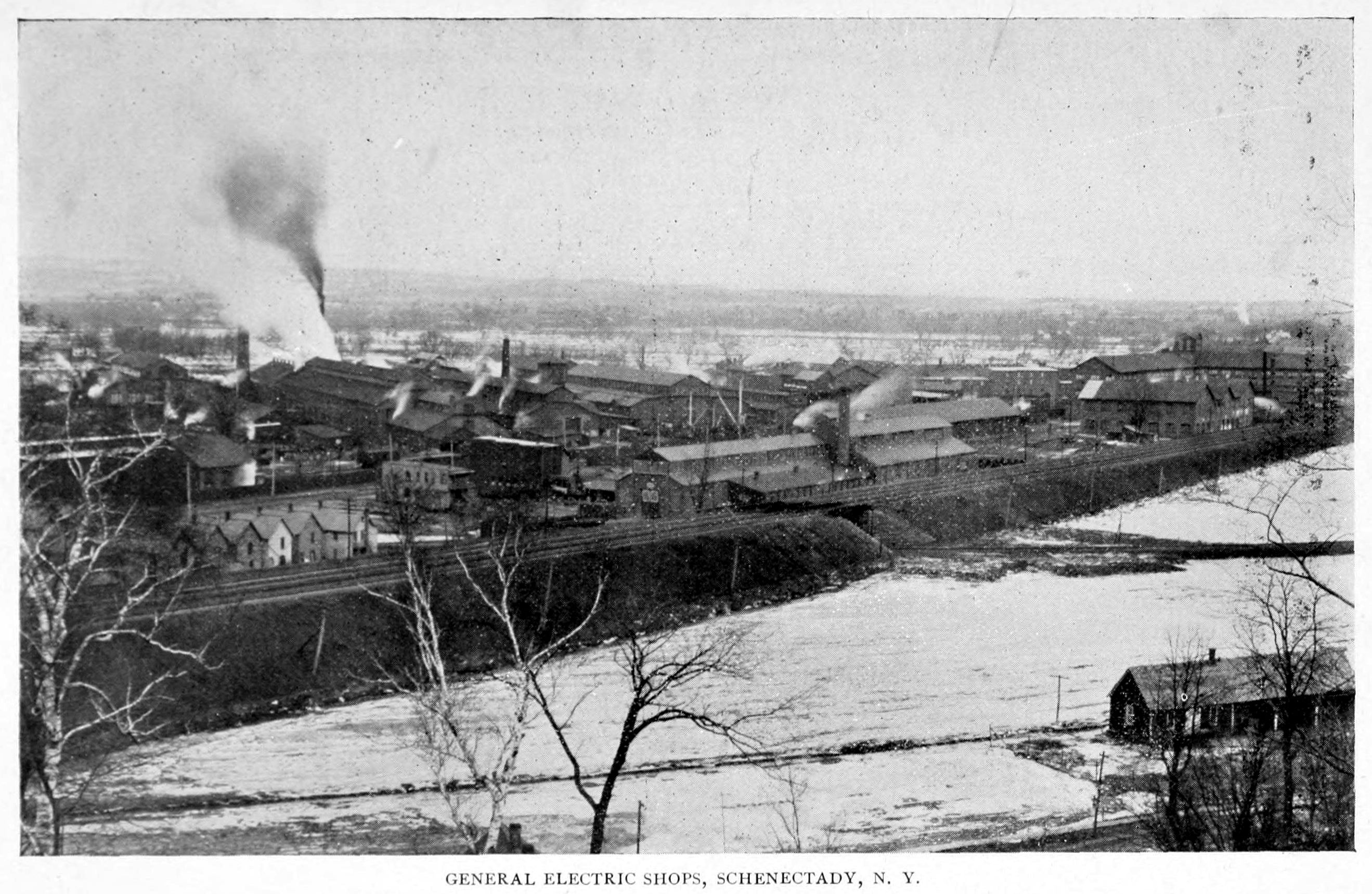
1896 view Schenectady, New York, location after it had become General Electric

The demands of the expanding utility soon overtaxed the cramped lower Manhattan shop. Extra lathes needed for production had to be set up on the sidewalks outside the building connected through the factory windows by long drive belts. Strikes, unionizing attempts, and the general expense of labor and land in New York City sent Edison looking for a site for a new factory. In 1886 the Machine Works, along with 200 of its workers, were moved to two unfinished factory buildings on a 10-acre site in Schenectady, New York, intended to have been the McQueen Locomotive Works. The new factory was put under the control of Samuel Insull. Edison Machine Works continued as a separate company until 1889, when all of Edison's electric related companies were merged to form Edison General Electric. The plant expanded rapidly and 1892 saw the merger of Edison General Electric and the Thomson-Houston Electric Company of Lynn, Massachusetts to form General Electric with the Schenectady location used as GE's headquarters for many years thereafter.

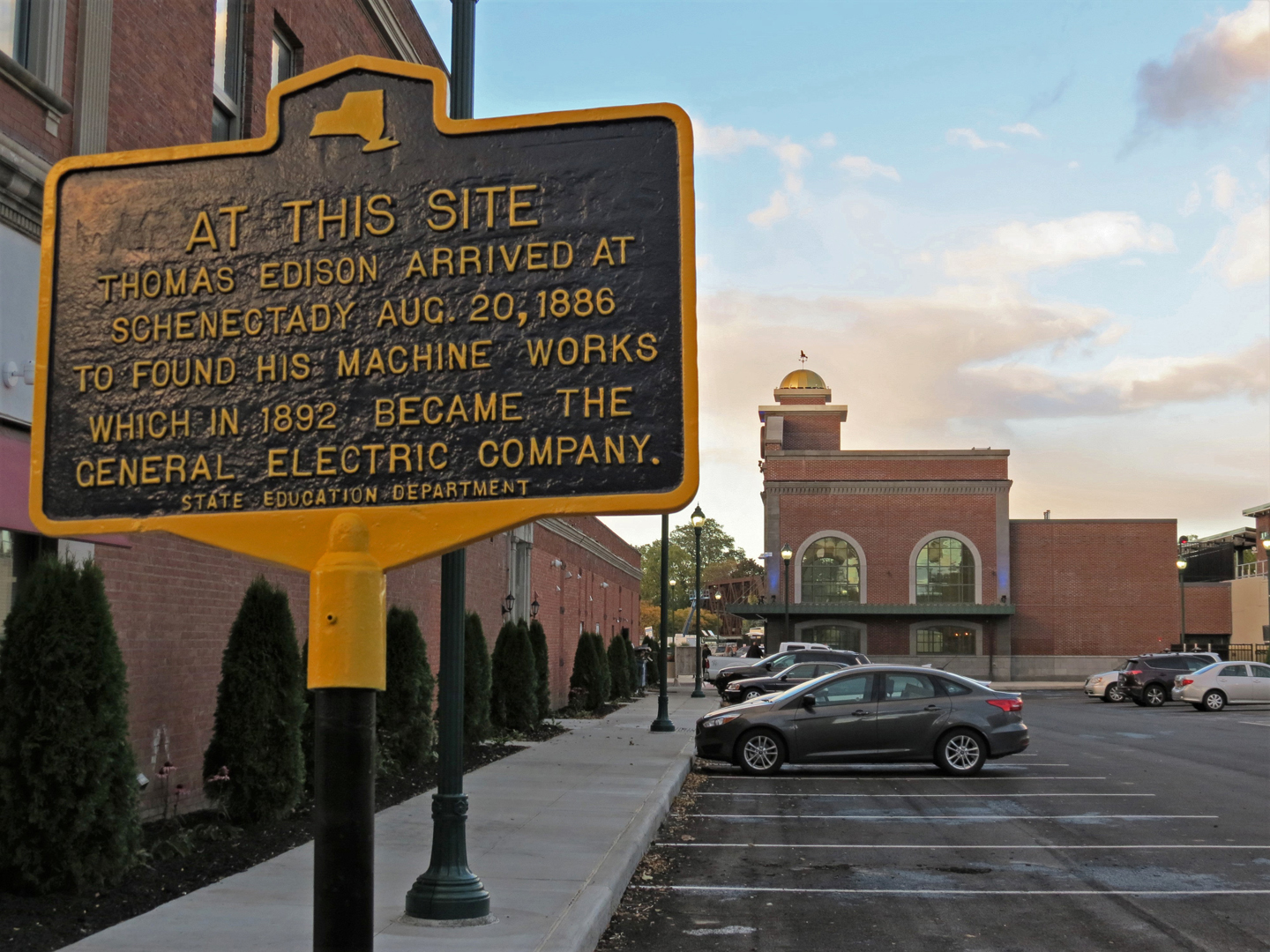
Historical marker about the Machine Works in Schenectady

== Notable employees ==
- Justus B. Entz – joined Edison Machine Works in 1887
- Reginald Fessenden – worked at the Edison Machine Works in 1886
- Kunihiko Iwadare – joined Edison Machine Works in 1887
- Emil Kolben – joined Edison Machine Works in 1888
- John W. Lieb – worked at the Edison Machine Works in 1881
- Nikola Tesla – worked at the Edison Machine Works in 1884
