= John I. Beggs =

American businessman (1847–1925)

John Irvin Beggs
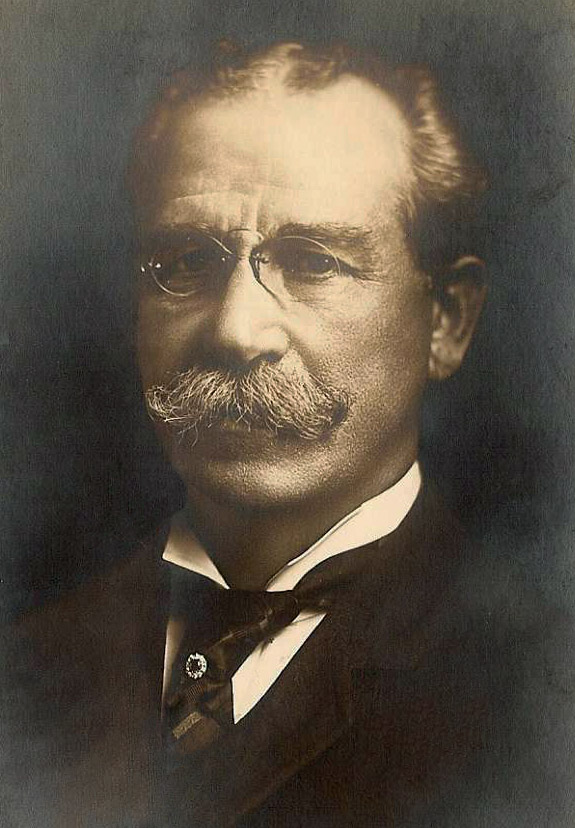
- Born: September 17, 1847; Philadelphia, Pennsylvania, U.S.
- Died: October 17, 1925 (aged 78); Milwaukee, Wisconsin, U.S.
- Occupations: Financier, Entrepreneur, Industrialist
- Spouse: Sue Elizabeth Charles

John Irvin Beggs (September 17, 1847 – October 17, 1925) was an American businessman. He was associated closely with the electric utility boom under Thomas Edison. He was also associated with Milwaukee; St. Louis, Missouri; and other regional rail and interurban trolley systems. Beggs is also known for developing modern depreciation techniques for business accounting and for being one of the early directors of what became General Electric.

== Youth ==
Beggs was born in Philadelphia on September 17, 1847, the son of James and Mary Irvin Beggs. Both of his parents were of Scottish descent but had emigrated to the United States from Northern Ireland.

His early life was spent around Philadelphia. After his father died when he was seven years old, Beggs worked to support his mother in a brickyard, as a cattleman, and as a butcher.

== Education ==
As a young man Beggs taught accounting and handwriting in the Bryant & Stratton Business College in Philadelphia. He went to Harrisburg, Pennsylvania, at the age of 21 to work for Mitchell & Haggerty Coal Company as an accountant. He then worked selling real estate and fire insurance in Harrisburg. Beggs joined the Masonic fraternities at Harrisburg and maintained his membership until his death.

== Electric light industry ==
When the electric light industry was in its infancy, Beggs helped to organize the Harrisburg Electric Light Co. He built and managed its plant: "the first commercially successful electric light plant in the United States". Beggs’ interest in electric lighting arose because he was head of the building committee of Grace Methodist Episcopal Church and wanted to electrify the church to save on the cost and cleanup of candles. This church became the first in the world to be wired and to use light bulbs instead of candles.

He was married in Harrisburg to Sue Elizabeth Charles, who died March 14, 1902. They had one child, Mary Grace Beggs.

His success in Harrisburg as an electric plant manager led to his 1886 hiring by J.P. Morgan as manager of the Edison Illuminating Company New York City. He remained there for about five years and built two electric stations. Pearl Street provided electricity for the first time to Wall Street's stockbrokers.

He worked closely with Thomas A. Edison and became one of the several dozen Edison Pioneers. He became a director of the Illuminating Company. He also was a director of Detroit Edison, and was present at the board meeting where Henry Ford first met Edison and pitched his idea for the automobile startup to venture capitalists.

== Career ==
From New York he went to Chicago as Western Manager of Edison Company where he remained until the Edison Company was merged with the Thomson-Houston Electric Company to form what is now the General Electric Company.

The North American Company, which had just been organized, had acquired an electric lighting interest in Cincinnati, Ohio, and Beggs went to Cincinnati in charge of these interests. The North American Company shortly afterward acquired the electric railway and lighting companies in Milwaukee, Wisconsin, and for several years, Beggs divided his time between these cities. In 1897, the Cincinnati interests were sold and Beggs moved to Milwaukee to devote his time to the utilities there.

In 1903, The North American Company began to acquire electric lighting interests in St. Louis, Missouri. Beggs first visited St. Louis as an advisor, and then began to divide his time between the two cities. At one time, Beggs was president of the St. Louis electric lighting company, the gas company, and the street railway company, as well as president and general manager of The Milwaukee Electric Railway and Light Company.

While Beggs was president of the Milwaukee Companies, he built the Public Service Building in Milwaukee. His funeral services would be conducted in its auditorium by the Employees' Mutual Benefit Association. He also constructed the interurban railways radiating from Milwaukee.

By 1911, Beggs had acquired a controlling interest in the St. Louis Car Company. He resigned from the Milwaukee companies and moved to St. Louis. He still maintained many business connections in Milwaukee and spent time there, although his residence was in St. Louis.

== Beggs Isle ==
In the spring of 1911, Beggs purchased an island in Lac La Belle, near Oconomowoc, Wisconsin (43.125°N 88.509°W). He renamed it Beggs Isle and built a summer residence for himself and his daughter's family. Beggs brought in exotic plants, including Egyptian papyrus plants trained to last through the long Wisconsin winters. For Fourth of July celebrations, Beggs purchased large commercial-grade fireworks.

In 1915, he invested in water power in northern Wisconsin and began to spend more time in that state, although still residing in St. Louis. In 1920 he was again elected president of The Milwaukee Electric Railway and Light Co., which position he still held at the time of his death.

Beggs was a member of the Executive Committee of the North American Company. He also devoted much time to the First Wisconsin National Bank in which he invested. During his last decade, he directed the construction of the second-largest paper mill in the country; engineered the reorganization of the J. I. Case Plow Company; arranged to finance a hotel in Atlantic City, New Jersey; and conducted a large Florida real estate transaction.

== Director and officer ==
At the time of his death, Beggs was a director or officer of 53 companies, including:

1. North American Edison Company, Director (Now General Electric)
2. The North American Company, Director, Member of Executive Committee
3. The Milwaukee Electric Railway and Light Company, Director, President, Member of Executive Committees
4. Wisconsin Gas & Electric Company, Director, Vice-President
5. Briggs & Stratton, Director, Chairman Executive Committee
6. St Louis Car Company, Director, Chairman of Board
7. J. I. Case Plow Works Company, Inc., Director
8. Southern Improvement Company, Director, President
9. First Wisconsin National Bank, Milwaukee, Director, Member of Executive and Finance Committees
10. First Wisconsin Company, Milwaukee, Director
11. Grand & Sixth National Bank, Milwaukee, Director, Member of Executive and Finance Committees
12. First National Bank in St. Louis, Director
13. Milwaukee Northern Railway Company, Director, President
14. Wisconsin Traction, Light, Heat & Power Company, Director, President
15. Peninsular Power Company, Director
16. North American Utilities Investment Corporation, Director
17. West Kentucky Coal Company, Director
18. United Railways Company of St. Louis, Director
19. Wisconsin Securities Company, Director, Member of Executive Committee
20. Wisconsin Public Service Corporation, Director
21. Menominee & Marinette Light & Traction Company, Director
22. Wisconsin Railway, Light & Power Company, Director
23. Land & Sea Investment Company, Baltimore, Director
24. Oil Transport Company, Baltimore, Director
25. Wisconsin Power, Light & Heat Company, Director
26. Wisconsin River Power Company (Hydro-Electric), Director
27. Southern Wisconsin Power Company (Hydro-Electric), Director
28. Northwestern Casualty & Surety Company, Director, Member of Executive and Finance Committees
29. The Newport Company, Director
30. Milwaukee Coke & Gas Company, Director
31. Globe Electric Company, Director, President
32. Globe Real Estate Company, Director, President
33. Wisconsin Real Estate Development Corporation, Director, President
34. Grand & Sixth Building, Inc., Director, President
35. Central Utilities Securities Corporation, Director, President, Treasurer
36. Midland Oil, Gas & Refining Company, Director
37. Lane Oil Producing Company, Director
38. Johnson & King Coal Company, Director, President
39. Raven Mining Company, Director
40. American Granite Company, Director, President
41. Shotwell Manufacturing Company, Director
42. East Coast Development Company (Florida), Director, President
43. Louisiana Pulp & Paper Company (Bastrop, LA.), Director, President
44. Frankenberg Refrigerating Company, Director
45. Prescott & Northwestern Ry. Company, (Prescott, Ark.), Vice-President
46. Montana Railroad Company (Clarksville, Ark.), President
47. President Apartment Hotel Company (Atlantic City), President

== Legacy ==
He died in Milwaukee on October 17, 1925, at the age of 78. He was buried in Harrisburg, Pennsylvania.

Edison and Beggs remained friends throughout their lifetimes. On Beggs' 75th-birthday celebration on Beggs Isle, Edison gave him a large grandfather clock and a photograph signed "To my hustler friend, Thomas A. Edison".

Beggs died with an estimated net worth of more than $20 million ($284 million today), which he bequeathed to his grandchildren: Robert Paxton McCulloch (1911–1977), Mary Sue McCulloch, "Suzie Linden" (1913–1996), and John Irvin Beggs McCulloch (1908–1983).

== Filmography ==
- "The Trolley at East Troy", a 1986 documentary directed by Louis Rugani.

== See also ==
- East Troy Electric Railroad
- Edison Pioneers
