= Johann Sigmund Schuckert =

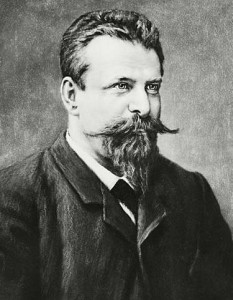
- Born: October 18, 1846; Nuremberg, Kingdom of Bavaria
- Died: 17 September 1895 (aged 48); Wiesbaden, German Empire
- Known for: 1876 Schuckert's Nuremberg Imperial road arc lamps.; 1878 Linderhof Castle electric lighting; Moscow Kremlin lighting system.; 1882 three arc lamps in the Nuremberg Imperial Street; 1886 first parabolic mirror glass for electric lights
- Honors: In Nuremberg (Eibach) there is named a school after Sigmund Schuckert .

Johann Sigmund Schuckert (18 October 1846 in Nuremberg - 17 September 1895 in Wiesbaden) was a German electrical engineer and the founder of Schuckert & Co. (after 1903 Siemens-Schuckert). He was a pioneer of industrialization in Nuremberg and for the electrical industry a pioneer of international status.

== Early years ==
Sigmund Schuckert was born in 1846, the son of a Master Barrel Maker. At elementary school, he was already familiarizing himself, through laboratory experiments, with the properties of electricity. Sigmund refused to follow in the footsteps of his father, becoming instead a precision mechanic. With the help of his teacher, he managed to obtain a mechanical apprenticeship with Friedrich Heller, Nuremberg's oldest electric company. In the meantime he pursued his hobby, telegraphy, at the same time, through self-study, deepening his knowledge of arithmetic, geometry, physics and chemistry.

Upon completion of his apprenticeship, Sigmund Schuckert worked successively as a journeyman in Munich, Stuttgart, Hannover and Berlin where he collaborated with Siemens & Halske. He was keen to meet the best professionals of the top companies in order to expand his knowledge and gain insights from those with whom he worked, while developing his own ideas.

Importantly, Schuckert now spent several years in America. Emigrants whom he met in Hamburg triggered a growing urge to go to the United States himself. While he was working in the electrical department of the Optical equipment business headed up by Albert Krage, Sigmund Schuckert learned English. In 1869 he began his journey. From New York he traveled via Baltimore, Philadelphia and Cincinnati, ending up in Newark, New Jersey, where he worked in the telegraph factory of Thomas Edison. According to Francis Jehl, "The experience he had gained in the Ward Street shop was the most valuable lesson he had ever received. There he had learned the true meaning of courage, resolution and honest conviction. Edison’s work in electricity led him (Schuckert) to resolve to enter the field himself. He did so through the arc light which was then to the fore, and after saving $1,000 went back to Nurnberg and started his first arc lamp and generator experiments."

== Middle years ==
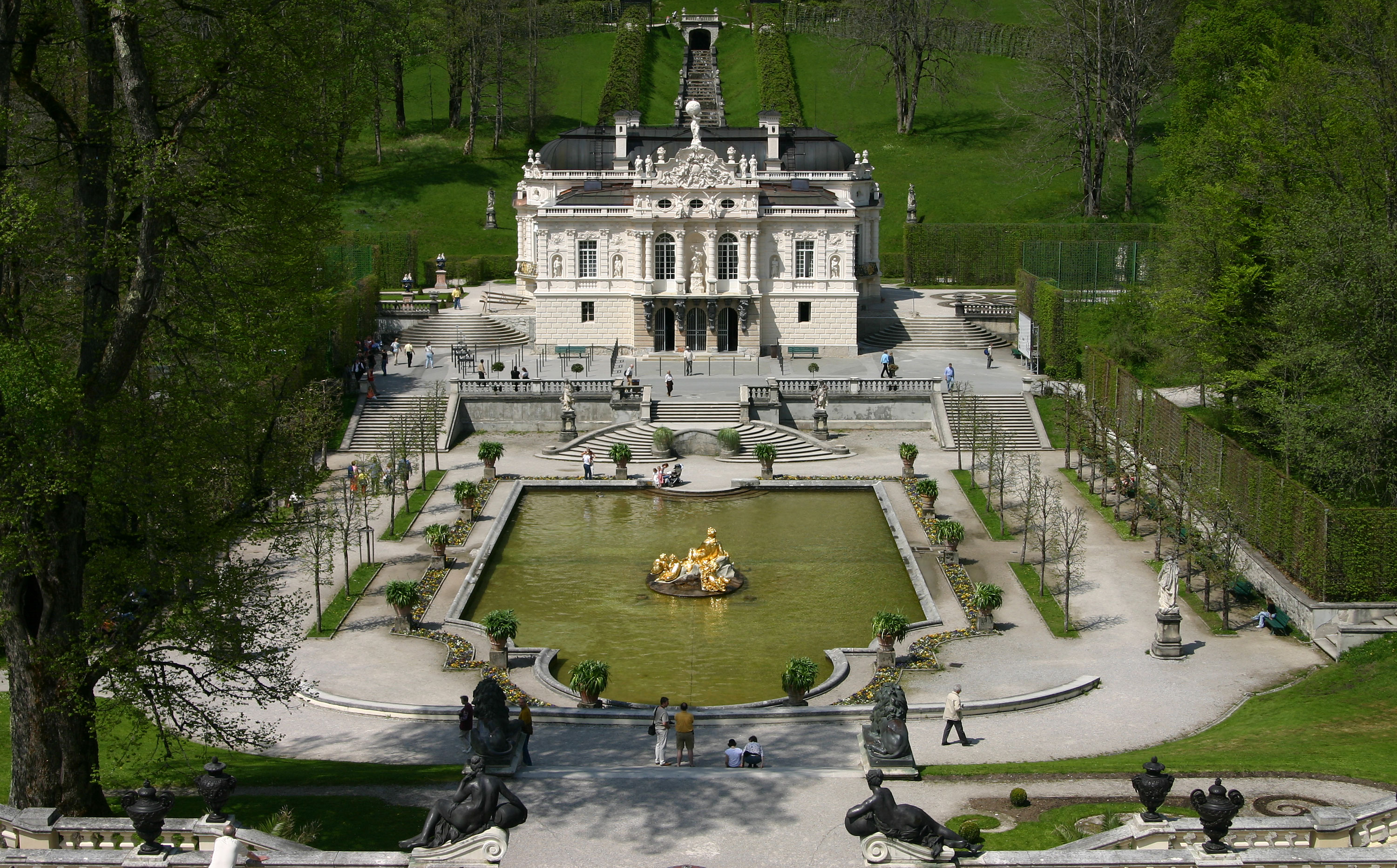
Linderhof Palace

In 1873 Sigmund Schuckert rented a small workshop in Nuremberg's "Schwabenmühle" quarter in Nuremberg, specialising initially in the repair of American Singer sewing machines, then a new technology of which hardly anyone else had experience. The recent move by Siemens into dynamo-generators production inspired him to greater ambition, however. In 1874 he negotiated for the rights to manufacture dynamos using the same principals as the Siemens ones, and from 1875 he was successfully producing and selling his own generators.

In 1876 he received a state subsidy of 50,000 Marks from the king for his generator production, and in 1878 he won the contract to install electric lighting in the kings stunning new Linderhof Palace. Schuckert's machines were less costly and more efficient than the alternatives proposed by rivals. Resulting success in the marketplace, supported by the high-profile Linderhof contract, increased pressure to grow the business.

Schuckert & Co. needed more space, and in 1879 a new factory building was opened in the Schloßäckerstraße. Schuckert was now becoming a major entrepreneur in his own right, being supported increasingly by advice from the businessman Alexander Wacker who would himself become the Commercial Director of Schuckert's business (and who subsequently created his own business, becoming a leading figure in the region's industrial community). The larger premises made possible a big increase in production of arc lights, the quality of which would receive widespread recognition at the Paris World Fair in 1889. The size of the factory and of the market demand for its products meant that conventional (traditional) craft based production techniques were replaced by a more industrial approach. In 1885 Alexander Wacker took a share in the business. Well qualified engineers and commercial managers were recruited in order to support further expansion of the business.

Devices
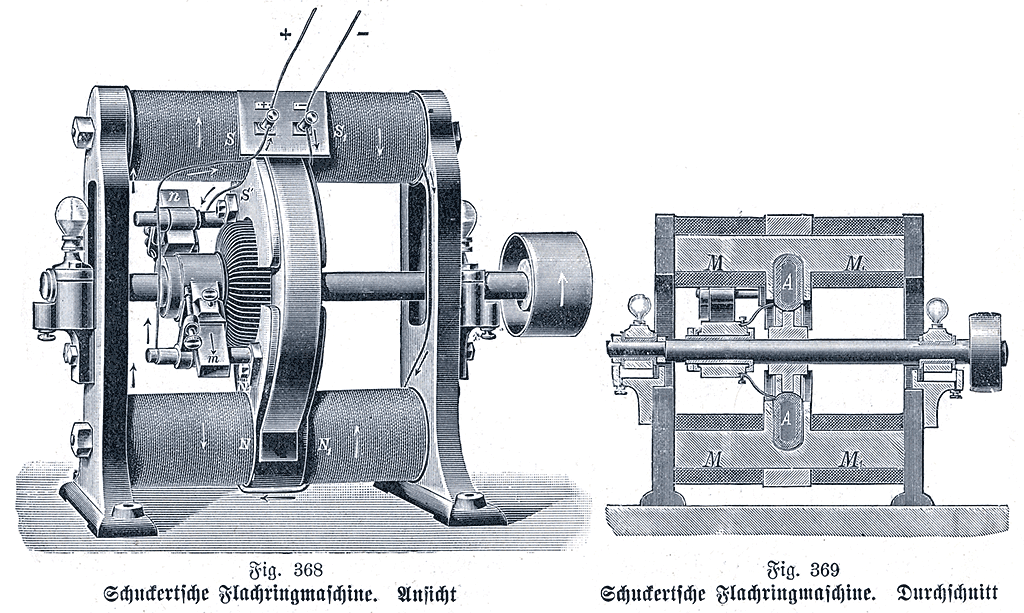
Electric generator (DC)

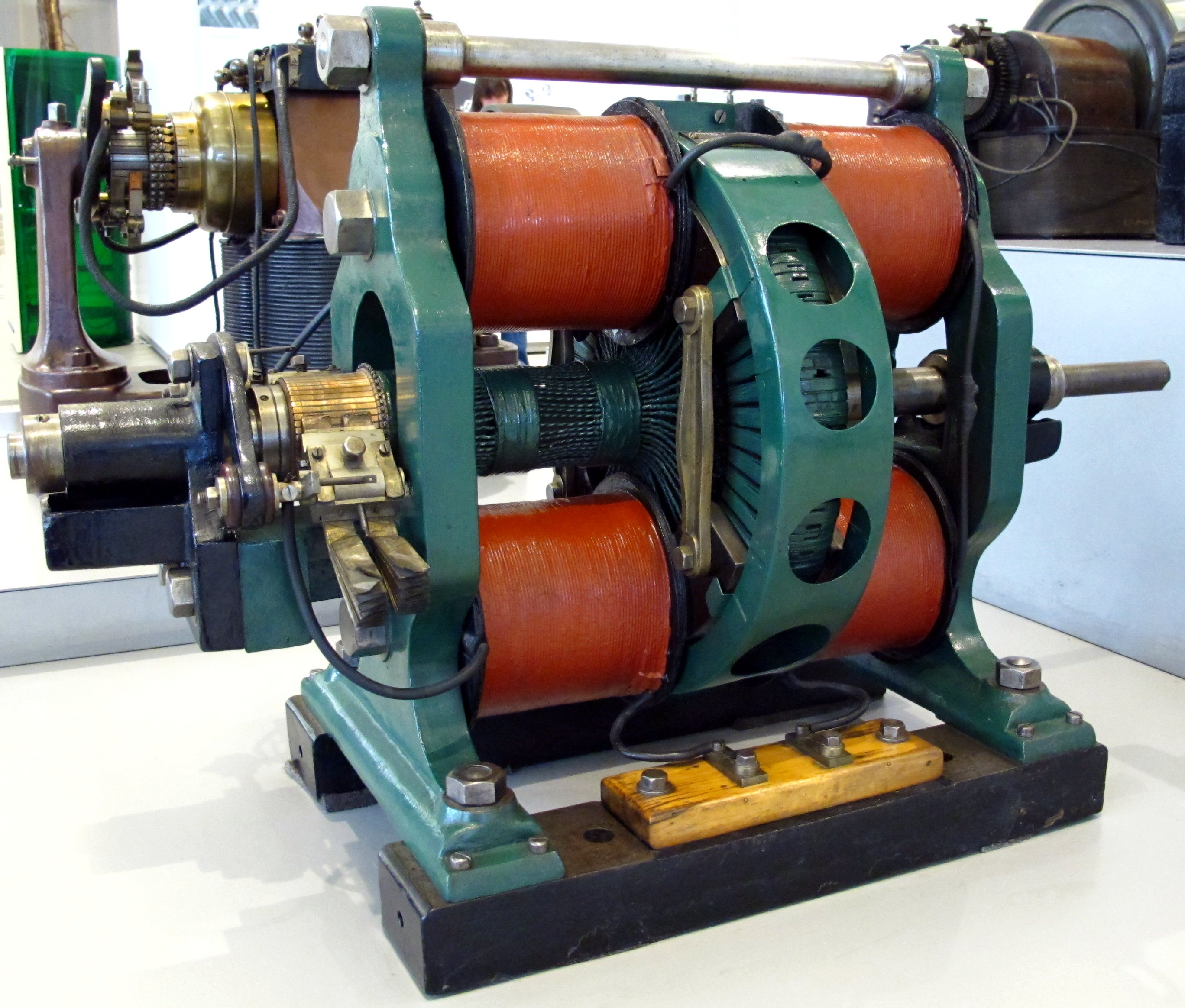
Czech flat ring-dynamo in the Technical Museum of Vienna

== Later years ==
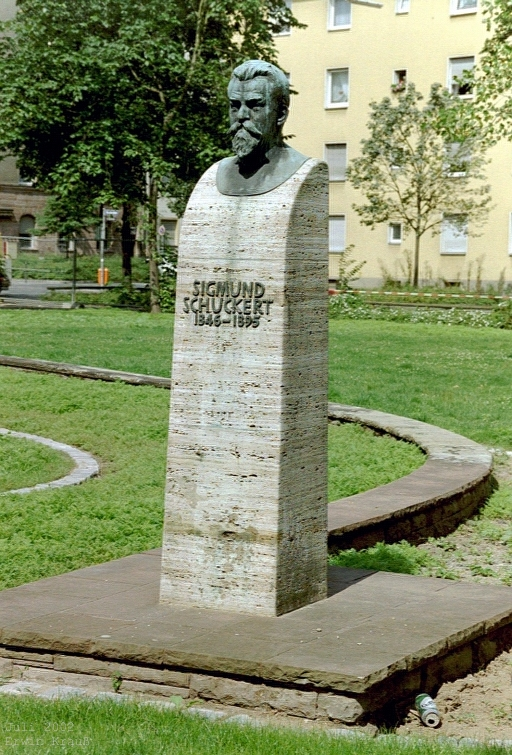
Sigmund Schuckert - bust at Schuckertplatz in Nuremberg.

It was not long before Schuckert & Co. was employing more than 280 people, with an annual turnover of 1.53 million marks. In order to be able to meet customer demand, additional land was acquired and production capacity built in the Landgrabenstraße. The invention of flood lighting further underpinned the company's expansion. In 1893 Schuckert exhibited at the Chicago World Fair what was at that time the largest flood light in the world. The Schukert plant was also producing complete electrical systems for the new electric trams.

Nervous exhaustion forced Sigmund Schukert to retire from his business in 1892, and in 1895 he died at Wiesbaden which was at that time a spa town of international renown. He is buried in the town's Nordfriedhof (North Cemetery).

The business in 1893 converted into a public limited company, registered as "EAG" (Elektrizitätsaktiengesellschaft/Electricity Public Company) and was taken over by Siemens & Halske in 1903. Siemens merged the business with their own AC Power equipment business to form the Siemens-Schuckertwerke. At this time approximately 2,500 electric generators were being produced annually along with a corresponding volume of arc lights, and electric testing, measuring and controlling equipment.

Subsequently, in 1966, manufacturing was subsumed fully into Siemens AG.

== Social conscience ==
The social support Schuckert's employees received greatly exceeded the company's legal responsibilities, and covered not just the employees themselves but also their immediate family members. In 1883 Schuckert established a company insurance scheme to provide pension and sickness benefits. During a period of rapid change and rising social tensions, Schuckert was perceived as a good employer, the man himself being known to his workers as "Father Schuckert". He provided a retail store which enabled employees to access discounted shopping, and he provided educational facilities. In the end he also set up the Sigmund Schuckert Foundation with the objective of supporting deserving schoolchildren and students.

One memorial to his memory is the "Wohnbaugemeinschaft Sigmund Schuckert" (Sigmund Schukert Social Housing Cooperative) foundation which he created. This became a template for Cooperative Social Housing in the German Empire. He was also a leading member of the Nuremberg "Morgengesellschaft".

== Legacy ==
Another memorial to Sigmund Schukert is the naming of the Sigmund Schuckert Gymnasium (Sigmund Schuckert Scientific, technical and languages High School) in the Eibach district of Nuremberg.

== See also ==
- History of electromagnetism
