= John W. Lieb =

American electrical engineer

- Born: February 12, 1860; Newark, New Jersey
- Died: November 1, 1929 (aged 69); New Rochelle, New York
- Education: Stevens Institute of Technology
- Awards: IEEE Edison Medal (1923)
- Scientific career
- Workplaces: Edison Electric Light Company

John William Lieb (February 12, 1860, in Newark, New Jersey – November 1, 1929, in New Rochelle, New York) was an American electrical engineer for the Edison Electric Light Company. Lieb was president of the American Institute of Electrical Engineers from 1904 to 1905. He received the IEEE Edison Medal for "the development and operation of electric central stations for illumination and power."

== Early life ==
John Lieb was born on February 12, 1860, in Newark New Jersey. His father was a leather worker. He went to the local public school, then went to the private school, Newark Academy, for high school. During the summer of 1875, Lieb went to the prep school for Stevens Institute of Technology. The following fall Lieb enrolled in Stevens as a Mechanical engineer.

== Stevens ==
Lieb entered college at a time when there were new waves happening in the electrical industry. Even though Lieb was studying mechanical engineering, he became interested in electricity. In 1877, Lieb and some classmate helped install a Brush arc light system on the Coney Island Pier. Right before graduation Lieb in 1880, Lieb visited Thomas Edison's lab at Menlo Park, where he saw the newly invented incandescent light bulb. This new experience and his experience with the Brush arc lighting system led him to join the Brush Electric Company in Cleveland.

== Career ==
Lieb was hired as a draftsman for the Brush Electric Company, but soon was trained to become a manager and conductor at a central station. During his 1880 Christmas holiday, Lieb was visiting family at home. He meet with Edison, and asked for a job with him. Edison hired him, and Lieb started working for him in January 1881. Lieb was assigned to Edison's office in New York City, where he also worked as a draftsman in the engineering department. He was quickly assigned to Edison Machine Works where he worked on designing the generators for the Pearl Street generating system. When the station opened in 1882, Lieb was placed in charge.

== Milan ==
When Italian Giuseppe Colombo visited the Edison Machine Works site to observe tests for dynamos for a station in Milan, he became impressed with Lieb. Colombo requested that Lieb oversee the installation of the plant in Milan for the Italian Edison Company. When the plant became operational in March 1883, Lieb was assigned chief electrician of the plant. Soon after this, Lieb was assigned as chief electrician for the entire Italian Edison Company, which later was renamed Societa Generale Italiana di Elettricita Sistema Edison that year. The company began to more central power stations during the second half of the 1880s, where Lieb was supervising the installation. The Milan station was one of the first stations to install an AC distribution system in 1886. While in Italy, Lieb ran experiments with direct driven alternators connected in parallel, and also installed Thomson-Houston arc lighting for the streets in the city. in early 1893 Lieb helped install Milan's first electric trolley line.

== Late career ==
In 1894 Lieb returned to the United States. When he returned he became assistant to R.R. Bowker, the vice-president of Edison Electric Illuminating Company in New York, which later became New York Edison. He became general manager and later vice-president for Edison Electric Illuminating Company. He was in charge of the company's technical operations, installation and operation of central stations and electrical distribution systems, and supervision of all research and development. At the time of his death he was senior vice president of New York Edison and president of Electrical Testing Laboratories, which he found.

== Personal life and achievements ==
Lieb married Minnie F. Engler while he was visiting the United States in 1886. He had three children with her. He was president of AIEE from 1904 to 1905. In 1923 Lieb won the Edison Medal from AIEE "For the development and operation of electric central stations for illumination and power." During his time in Italy he became a member of Raccolta Vinciana of Milan, and continued to pursue his interest in Leonardo da Vinci by collecting a large library of his work. He was also made Knight Commander of the Royal Order of the Crown of Italy, and later promoted to Grand Officer. He was also made an officer of the French Legion of Honor. He also spoke 4 languages fluently. He was the president of National Electric Light Association, The Edison Pioneers, and the New York Electrical Society. In 1921 he received an honorary doctorate degree from Stevens Institute of Technology.
