= Francis Robbins Upton =

American mathematician

Francis R. Upton
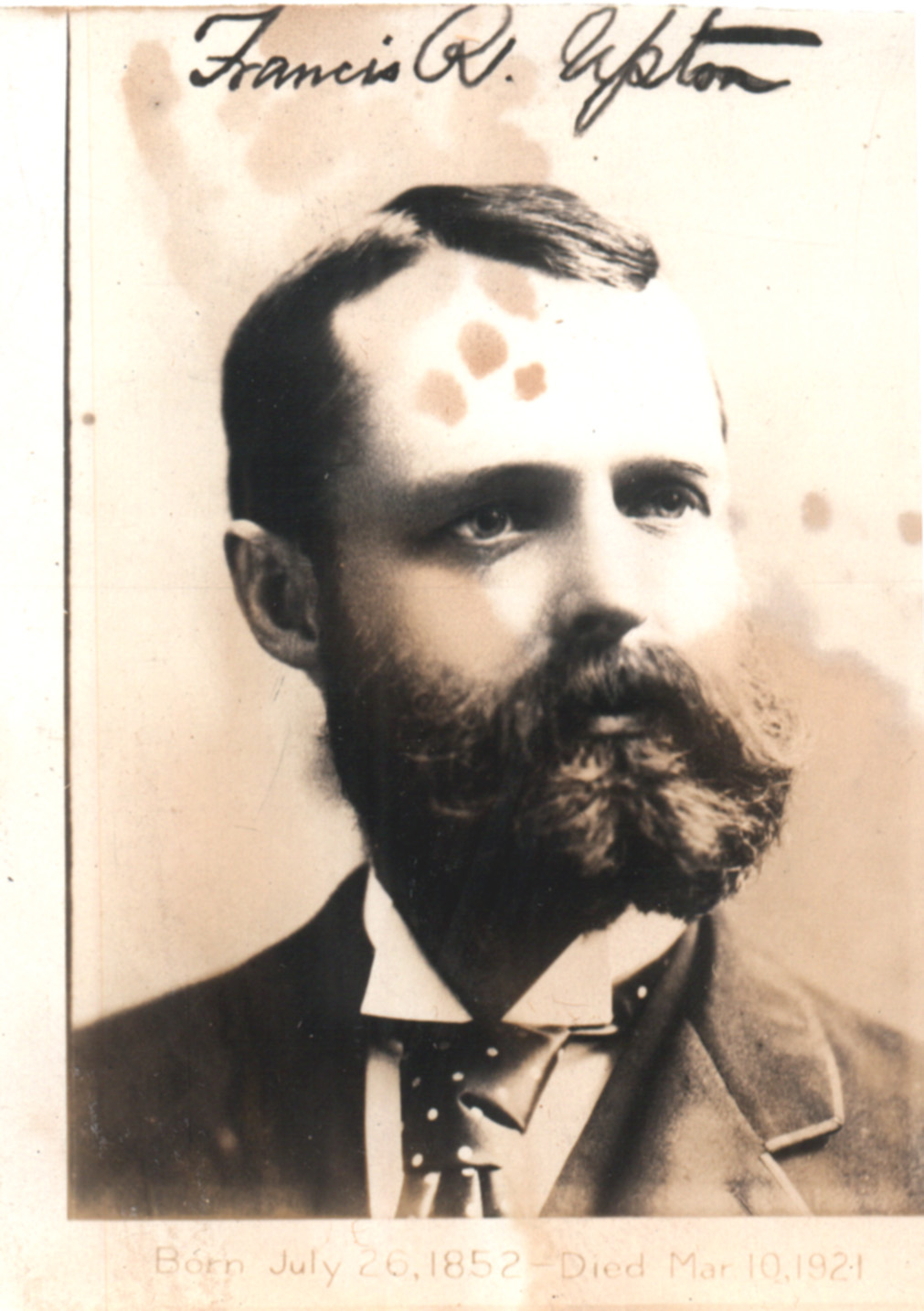
- Born: 1852; Peabody, Massachusetts
- Died: March 10, 1921 (aged 68–69); Orange, New Jersey
- Education: Bowdoin College (BS); Princeton University (PhD)
- Occupations: Physicist and Mathematician
- Years active: 1878–1911
- Known for: Smoke detector

Francis Robbins Upton (1852 in Peabody, Massachusetts – March 10, 1921, in Orange, New Jersey) was an American physicist and mathematician. Upton worked alongside Thomas Edison in the development of incandescent light bulbs, electric generators, and electric power distribution. He was the first president of the Edison Pioneers.

== Early life ==
Francis Upton was the son of Elijah Wood Upton and Lucy Elizabeth Winchester. Elijah was well educated and after, he did European travel. Later he was forced to take over his father's glue business due to his father's illness. Francis was 16 by this time and studying at Phillips Academy in Andover, after he received a Bachelor of Science degree in 1875 at Bowdoin College in Brunswick, ME. There he met Elizabeth F. Perry, later to become his wife.

Francis Upton also attended Berlin University and Princeton University. Francis was the first ever to officially receive his doctoral degree from Princeton University. Upton was then hired by Thomas Edison. One of Edison's biographers described the hired man thus:

Two years Edison’s senior, Boston-born graduate of Bowdoin College and Princeton, expert in calculus, tempered by a year of postgraduate study at the University of Berlin with Hermann von Helmholtz.

Upton married Elizabeth F. Perry in September, 1879, in Brunswick, Maine. Their daughter Elizabeth Fenno Upton was born August 24, 1880. Upton's sister Sadie, a frequent visitor in Menlo Park, is described as a "smart attractive lady with a distinguished swing".

== Work life ==
Upton was hired by Edison in 1878 on the recommendation of Grosvenor Lowrey.

Upton possessed a mild, modest disposition combined with a keen intelligence. His versatile knowledge of physics made him a most valuable assistant to Edison in that period.

Edison was largely self-educated. He was brimming over with ideas but needed someone with advanced mathematical skills who could do calculations and research the scientific literature to help solve intractable problems. As Francis Jehl was also working with Edison, he needed another handle besides Francis for Upton:

Affectionately nicknamed "Culture" by his boss because of his introspective, learned mien, piano-playing talent, and impeccable educational credentials.

The challenge of electric illumination was addressed:

Upton’s very first assignment for the company was to conduct an extensive literature search through existing domestic and foreign patents for all the information he could find about arc and incandescent lighting.
Many thought that only current (quantity) was the magnitude register of work, without taking potential into consideration. Upton ransacked the Philosophical Magazine, the Poggendorf Annalen, the Comptes Rendus, Dingler's Polytechnical Journal and other musty volumes of scientific societies in search of data, trying to put Edison’s ideas into practical form.

Initially experiments ran currents through metals. Upton attended the 28th meeting of the American Association for the Advancement of Science and spoke "On the phenomena of heating metals in vacuo by means of electric current". Upton and Edison worked together on the incandescent lamp and in 1880 Upton reported on the history of electric lighting and Edison's lamp.

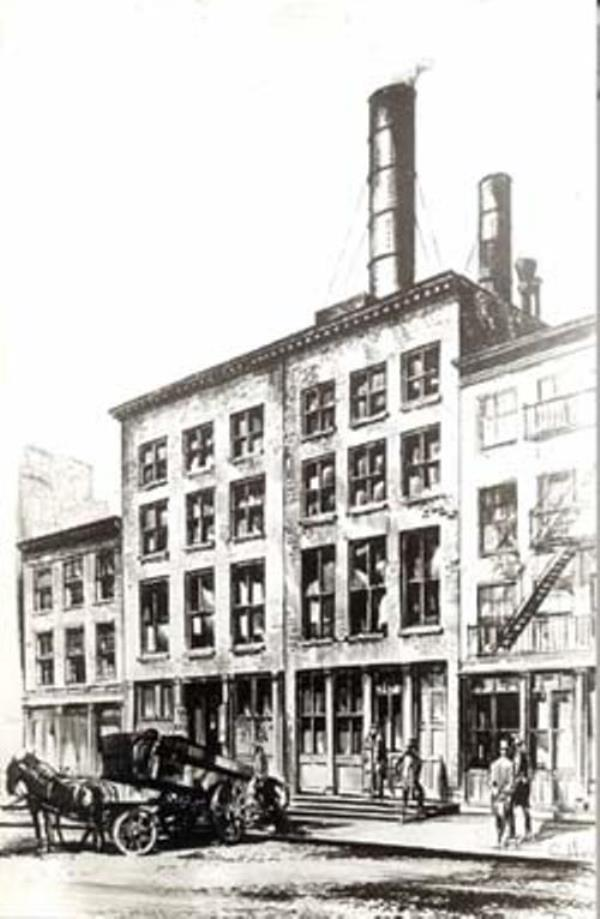
A sketch of the Pearl Street Station

As evidence of the Upton's use of algebra, his approach to finding the appropriate cross-section S for a wire of length L carrying W amperes at V volts, was to take resistance R = L / S. Upton applied Ohm's law to obtain S = (W L) / V.

Upton has been credited with helping Edison govern his Menlo Park laboratory:

Francis Upton’s arrival marked the transition from initial freneticism to a more reasoned approach at Menlo Park, not only because of the thoroughly grounded aspect of his research but also because his austere sensibility had a salutatory influence on Edison.

When Edison's generator was evaluated, Upton published the report.

Upton contributed to other key inventions such as the watt-hour meter, the parallel circuit distribution grid and the new constant voltage dynamo. Upton was of crucial importance to Edison in the design of Edison's power plant and distribution system put into service at the Pearl Street Station in Lower Manhattan on September 4, 1882.

Like Maxwell with Faraday, Upton was the one who interpreted Edison’s ideas and translated them into mathematical form. What he did was a classical piece of pioneer investigation conducted under extreme difficulties. His work paved the way for more elaborate work of Hopkinson and Knapp.

In 1890, Upton patented the first electric fire alarm and detector along with a Mr. Fernando J. Dibble, an accomplishment of his which is often overlooked, stemming most probably from a typographical error that labels the device a "Portable Electric Tire-Alarm".

Since 1958, the Princeton University has had Francis Upton Graduate Fellowships.

== Later life ==
In 1894 Francis Robbins Upton left Edison's electrical business which he had managed up to his departure. Upton returned after four years. He assisted in the Edison Ore-Milling Company, extracting iron from sand, and the remaining sand Upton sold to concrete manufactures. Upton eventually left the business in 1911 but still continued to sell bricks and concrete.

On February 3, 1918, the Edison Pioneers elected Upton as their first President.

Francis Robbins Upton died in Orange, New Jersey, on March 10, 1921.
