= Francis Jehl =

American assistant to Thomas Edison

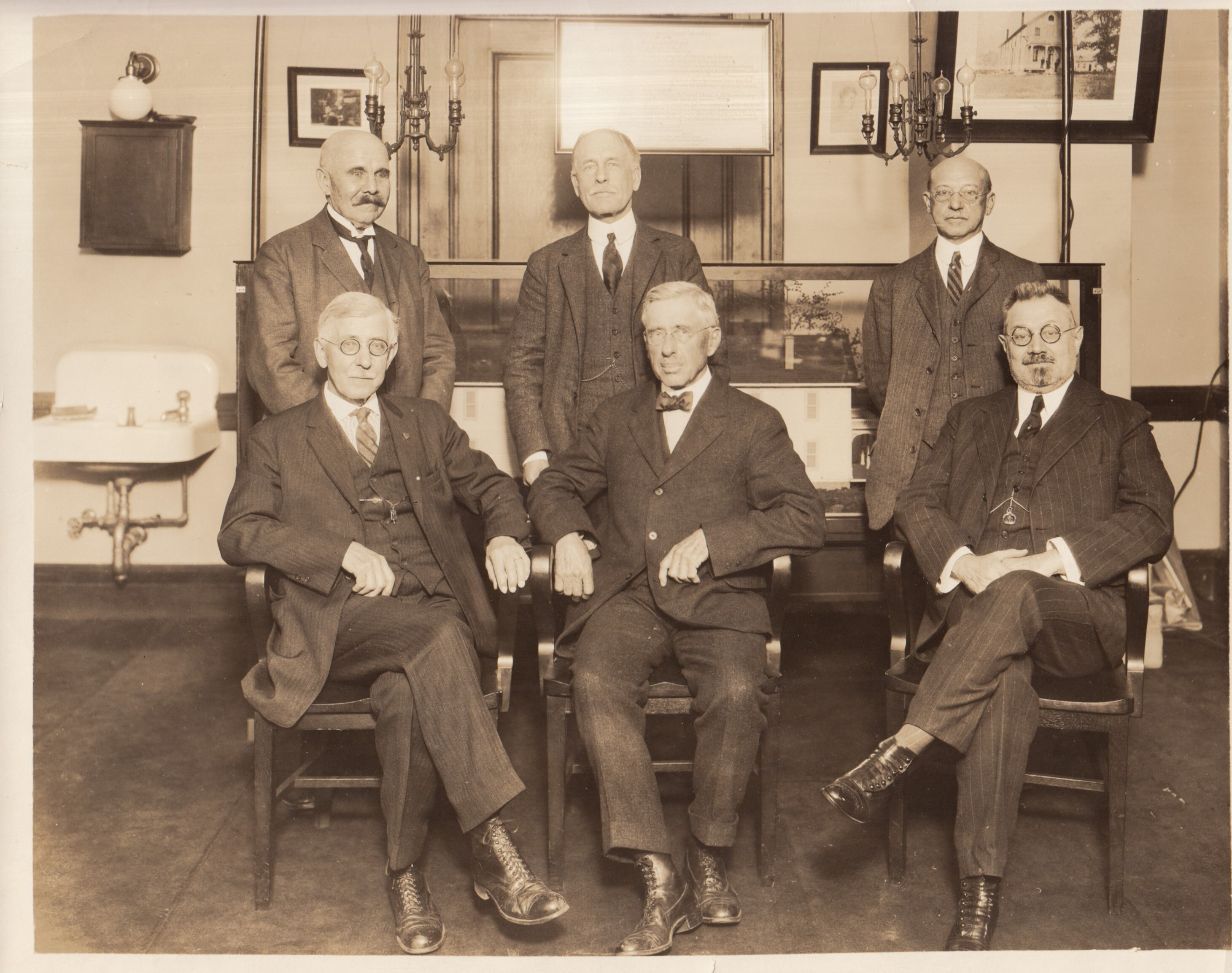
- Jehl (bottom left) in 1923.
- Born: September 6, 1860; New York, New York
- Died: February 11, 1941 (aged 80); St. Petersburg, Florida
- Occupation: Inventor

Francis Jehl (September 6, 1860 - February 11, 1941) was a laboratory assistant of Thomas Edison. Jehl studied chemistry at Cooper Union at night. After finishing school at the age of 18, he went to work for Edison at Menlo Park. In 1882, Jehl went to Europe to introduce the Edison light system in the various European countries. Jehl wrote a book titled Reminiscences of Menlo Park based on a diary of his experiences at the laboratory.

== History ==
Before Jehl worked for Edison he worked for Grosvenor P. Lowrey, who was the chief counsel of Western Union Telegraph Company. When Jehl worked for Lowrey he was responsible for making multiple copies of a wide range of documents using Edison's electric pen. One of the other duties that came with Jehl's employment with Lowrey was overseeing the care of Bunsen cells which provided the current for the pen.

In February 1879 Jehl began his employment with Edison at Menlo Park, a facility in New Jersey where Edison researched and developed his inventions that had only been around for two years when Jehl arrived. Given his experience at Western Union with Bunsen cells, Jehl maintained 50 or so Bunsen cells on a variety of tables on the second floor of the laboratory. After the completion of Jehl's first assignment, Edison noticed Jehl's work ethic and he was so impressed that he made him a personal assistant. Jehl worked on the electric lamp during the laboratory stage of development. Jehl was responsible for performing many experiments and tests; however, some of the most important were those that were related to the electric meter for the central stations. Edison had given Jehl specific instructions to keep him informed daily with the tests and experiments that he conducted and the results obtained. With the results that Edison received from Jehl, he was able to make informed decisions on how to create things, like the thermal regulator for the meter.

The city of Brno opted for electric lighting for the Mahen Theatre in 1882 and contracted the Edison company to supply the lighting system. Jehl supervised the installation. After the International Electrical Congress in 1881 there was a strong demand for Edison's products, so Jehl and coworkers conducted Edison's business in Europe. They promulgated the watt-hour meter and parallel circuit distribution grid that Edison had developed with his team including Francis Upton.

During the two years that Jehl spent at Menlo Park, he kept a personal diary. This diary detailed some of the exceptional things that he personally witnessed during his employment there. This diary was the foundation for Jehl's personal book, titled Reminiscences of Menlo Park, which was published fifty years afterwards. Jehl was one of the Edison Pioneers who gathered in 1918 and thereafter to recall the early collaboration with Edison.

== Death ==
Jehl died on February 11, 1941, in St. Petersburg, Florida, at the age of 80. Jehl was one of the last surviving associates to Thomas Edison, whom he assisted with the creation of the incandescent light. Jehl was survived by his wife, and son Fred Jehl, in Budapest, Hungary.

== Bibliography ==
- 1899: The Manufacture of Carbons for Electric Lighting and Other Purposes via Internet Archive
- 1937: Menlo Park Reminiscences, volume 1, Edison Institute via HathiTrust
- 1939: Menlo Park Reminiscences, volume 2, Edison Institute via HathiTrust
- 1941: Menlo Park Reminiscences, volume 3, Edison Institute via HathiTrust
