= George F. Morrison =

American business executive (1867–1943)

George F. Morrison

George Francis Morrison (1867–1943), was an American business executive, industrialist, Edison Pioneer, and a Director and Vice President of General Electric Company. He was one of Thomas Edison's closest associates and a pioneer in the production of the incandescent lamp. Towards the latter part of his decades-long career, Morrison traveled the world introducing the lamp and promoting its use.

== Early life ==
George Francis Morrison was born on February 22, 1867, in Wellsville, New York. His father William Morrison was born in County Clare, Ireland, and worked as a teamster. His mother Susan Maguire was also from Ireland. The Morrisons initially settled in Harrison, New Jersey, where George's three older sisters Elizabeth, Mary Ann, and Margaret were born. William moved the family to the Wellsville area before George was born, most likely because of the perceived fortunes promised by the nascent crude oil industry in western New York. After ten years and the marriages of George's sisters Mary Ann and Elizabeth, the family returned to Harrison.

== Career ==
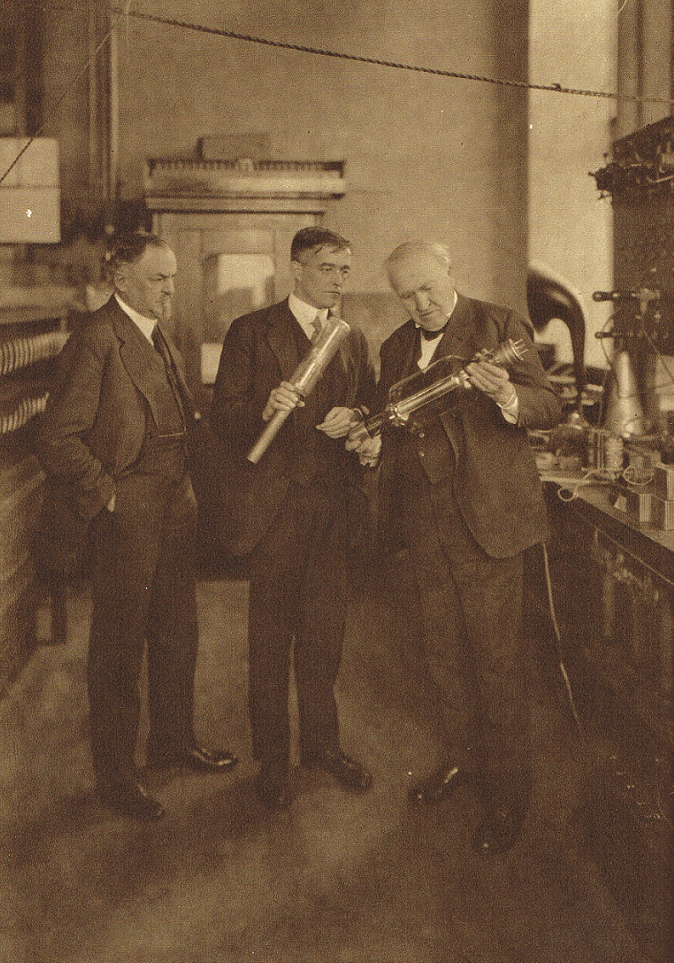
George in the GE research laboratory with Dr. Irving Langmuir and Thomas Edison examining a vacuum tube.

Morrison began his career in the summer of 1882 at Edison Lamp Works in Harrison when he was 15 years old. He was hired to unwrap and smooth tissue paper from incandescent light bulbs that arrived from the Corning Glass Works in Corning, New York, so that they could be reused in packaging finished lamps. He was paid one and two-thirds cents per hour, equating to only one dollar per week if he worked sixty hours. He continued to perform other basic tasks at the plant but did them very well, which did not go unnoticed and created opportunities for advancement. A graduate of New Jersey Business College in Newark, Morrison was soon promoted to foreman and became associated with Thomas Edison in his experimental lamp testing department. After a few more promotions, Morrison then took charge of the instrument standardization department and eventually became the general foremen of the plant. He was promoted again to Plant Superintendent and then became the General Manager of all of GE's plants by 1903. In January 1917, Morrison was elected as a Vice President of General Electric Company (GE) and in February 1918 he became one of the original members of the Association of Edison Pioneers

Several innovations during this time, such as the development of tungsten filaments, allowed brighter and longer-lasting bulbs, with production steadily increasing throughout the ensuing years. Morrison was instrumental in the expansion of GE's lamp business and took a leading role in establishing strong relationships with other lamp manufacturers, both domestically and abroad, which ultimately led to standardization within the industry. He was known for having good judgement and being able to see both sides of an issue and arrive to accurate conclusions. He was said to have never made an enemy throughout his career and became close personal friends with all of his business associates.

As an executive, Morrison ensured the management and enforcement of GE's patents. On April 28, 1926, Morrison wrote to Gerard Swope, president of GE at the time, to bring attention to the early expiration of three vital patents covering the tungsten lamp, upon which GE's market share virtually completely rested. Morrison went on to acknowledge that cross-patent licensing agreements with Westinghouse, GE's largest lamp manufacturing competitor, was essential to prevent other competitors from gaining share of General Electric's markets.

Towards the latter part of his career, Morrison began traveling around the world looking after GE's foreign interests, as well as to introduce and promote the incandescent lamp. Among the countries he visited were England, France, Russia, Japan, and China. He met Joseph Stalin in Russia, and after introducing the lamp in Japan, Emperor Taishō bestowed upon him the Order of the Rising Sun.

Morrison was also the chairman of the board of directors of the Sprague Electric Company and a director of the Intertype Corporation. He served on the board of directors of both General Electric and International General Electric from 1922 to 1942 and was honorary Vice President at the time of his death in 1943.

George F. Morrison with Thomas Edison and associates. From left to right is Edwin W. Rice Jr., W.L.R. Emmet, Thomas A. Edison, George F. Morrison, Charles P. Steinmetz, and H.F.T. Erben

== Family ==
George and his wife Jennie had seven children, Blanche, Jennie, Flora, Beatrice, Georgina, George Jr., and Franklin. He assisted his brother-in-law John Graves, his sister Mary Ann's husband, in obtaining a trucking license in New Jersey after moving to Harrison from Wellsville. Graves eventually built a trucking business called Graves Trucking that maintained a number of large accounts, including that of RCA Corporation. George also did his best to secure jobs for his unemployed family members during the Great Depression. In one instance, he found his niece Dorothy Graves O'Brien a job at the Edison Lamp Works carrying trays of light bulbs from one work station to another.

Morrison was the uncle of western film legend George "Gabby" Hayes, the son of his older sister Elizabeth Morrison and Clark Hayes.

Morrison's daughter Georgina was the second wife of William C. Krueger, president of Gottfried Krueger Brewing Company and son of its founder, Gottfried Krueger.

Morrison died on October 21, 1943, in his home in East Orange, New Jersey, at the age of 76.

== See also ==
- Thomas A. Edison Visits Steinmetz 1922 Part 1 on YouTube, Morrison is seen throughout this early film and is identified at 1:23.
- Thomas Edison in Schenectady - 1922 on YouTube, Morrison can be seen at 0:42, 4:47, and 5:57.
