= Public Service Building (Milwaukee, Wisconsin) =

Historic building in Milwaukee, Wisconsin

- Interactive map of the Public Service Building area

General information
- Status: Completed
- Architectural style: Beaux-Arts
- Location: 231 W Michigan St; Milwaukee, WI 53203
- Coordinates: 43°02′13″N 87°54′49″W
- Opening: 1905

Technical details
- Floor count: 4

Design and construction
- Architect: Herman J. Esser
- Public Service Building
- U.S. National Register of Historic Places
- NRHP reference No.: 98000576
- Added to NRHP: May 20, 1998

The Public Service Building is a historic former interurban terminal and office building in Milwaukee, Wisconsin, United States. Originally constructed by The Milwaukee Electric Railway and Light Company in 1905, it is currently occupied by We Energies, a subsidiary of that company's successor, WEC Energy Group.

== Description ==
Entrance of the Public Service Building, with streetcar imagery visible

The Public Service Building is a four-story neoclassical Beaux-Arts office building occupying a whole city block in Downtown Milwaukee. Featuring a two-story marble lobby, stained-glass skylights, and an auditorium, it was originally designed as a mixed-use facility serving both interurban passengers and office workers of The Milwaukee Electric Railway and Light Company (TMER&L). An arch surrounding the entrance depicts technological progress in transportation: first as a horse-drawn streetcar, then as an electric streetcar. In the lobby, a copper art piece shows bees buzzing around a beehive, representing the amount of activity occurring inside. Rail vehicles formerly entered and exited the building through multiple ground-level access points. A skyway connects the Public Service Building with a second building that, together, form the downtown headquarters for We Energies.

== History ==
=== Interurban terminal ===
TMER&L used the Public Service Building as a terminal for its interurban services since its opening in 1905. By the early 1940s, more passengers were boarding buses operated by Greyhound Lines at the building than trains. Train service had extended as far as East Troy and Watertown, but shrank during the 1940s, only going as far as Waukesha and Hales Corners before ending completely in 1951.

=== Post-interurban era ===
Following the end of train service, tracks and platforms were removed from the building, converting it to solely office space. However, the former ticket booth still remains. A fifth floor was added in 1956, but was removed during a renovation in the 1990s.

=== 2020 steam tunnel disaster ===
In May 2020, the Public Service Building was significantly damaged. A rainstorm flooded the We Energies steam tunnel system with millions of gallons of water, which proceeded to boil from contact with hot steam pipes. Electric sump pumps failed in the face of a "tidal wave" of boiling sanitary and sewer water. All steam customers in East Town, and some in Westown, lost service. Electrical infrastructure and insulation for the system was destroyed, and steam entered the building through an access point in the basement, blowing the door off. PVC piping melted from exposure to temperatures of over 200 °F (93 °C). All levels of the building suffered water and heat damage to walls, ceiling tiles, elevators, computers, furniture, machinery, artwork, architectural elements, and other items. Risk of mold was increased due to the humid conditions. Operational disruption was mitigated by timing; the disaster not only occurred on a weekend, but also when most employees were already working remotely due to the COVID-19 pandemic.

The initial estimate to repair the building was $10 million; by the end of the project, $62 million had been spent. Repairs took 18 months to complete, and had the disaster happened later in the pandemic, supply chain disruptions could have lengthened the timeline by a year. The repairs provided an opportunity to reconfigure the building so that outdated paper record storage rooms could be repurposed as additional work space. In December 2021, restoration was complete, and the Public Service Building was reopened.

== Recognition ==
The Public Service Building has been placed on the Wisconsin State Register of Historic Places since 1997 and the National Register of Historic Places since 1998.

== See also ==
- Milwaukee Intermodal Station
- Valley Power Plant
