= Justus B. Entz =

American engineer

Justus Bulkley Entz (June 16, 1867, New York City – June 8, 1947, New Rochelle, New York) was an American electrical engineer and inventor. He invented the electromagnetic transmission, introduced with the 1908 Columbia Mk MXLVI, re-introduced as the Owen Magnetic of 1915, and was a pioneer in the early automobile industry.

== Life ==
In 1887, Justus Entz began working for Thomas A. Edison as an electrician at the Edison Machine Works. He stayed with Edison until 1890 and left as a chief electrician. Entz entered into several patent agreements with Edison and was granted royalty payments for any future use of certain patents.

During the 1890s, Entz became fascinated with the development of the automobile, and by 1897 he was working as a chief engineer at the Electric Storage Battery Company in Philadelphia, Pennsylvania. In 1897 this company introduced an electric-powered cab to the streets of New York and Philadelphia. It was while working for the Electric Storage Battery Company that Entz designed a gasoline-powered automobile with an electric drive transmission, and this was built as the prototype Columbia Mark IX by the Pope Manufacturing Company. On the vehicle's test run, driven by Hiram Percy Maxim, an electric spark ignited fuel in the gasoline tank and destroyed the car. Still, the basic design was good, and Entz took out a patent on it.

By 1902, Entz was working on ways to perfect his electromagnetic transmission. The device he ultimately came up with used a magnetic field to drive a propeller or driveshaft. By varying the intensity of the field, a vehicle could go faster or slower without using a clutch. In 1912, Walter C. Baker purchased the patent rights to the Entz Transmission and then licensed the technology to Raymond Owen of R. M. Owen & Company. Owen used the technology to produce a gasoline-powered automobile that utilized the Entz electromagnetic transmission, called the Owen Magnetic.

Justus Entz was altogether granted 75 patents in automotive engineering. He died in 1947, a few days short of his 80th birthday.

== Patents ==
- U.S. patent 400,838 Dynamo electric machine.
- CA Patent 204067 Transmission and control for motor vehicles.
- US 1207732 Magnetic drive
