= Thomas Alva Edison Memorial Tower and Museum =

- Thomas A. Edison Memorial Tower
- U.S. National Register of Historic Places
- New Jersey Register of Historic Places
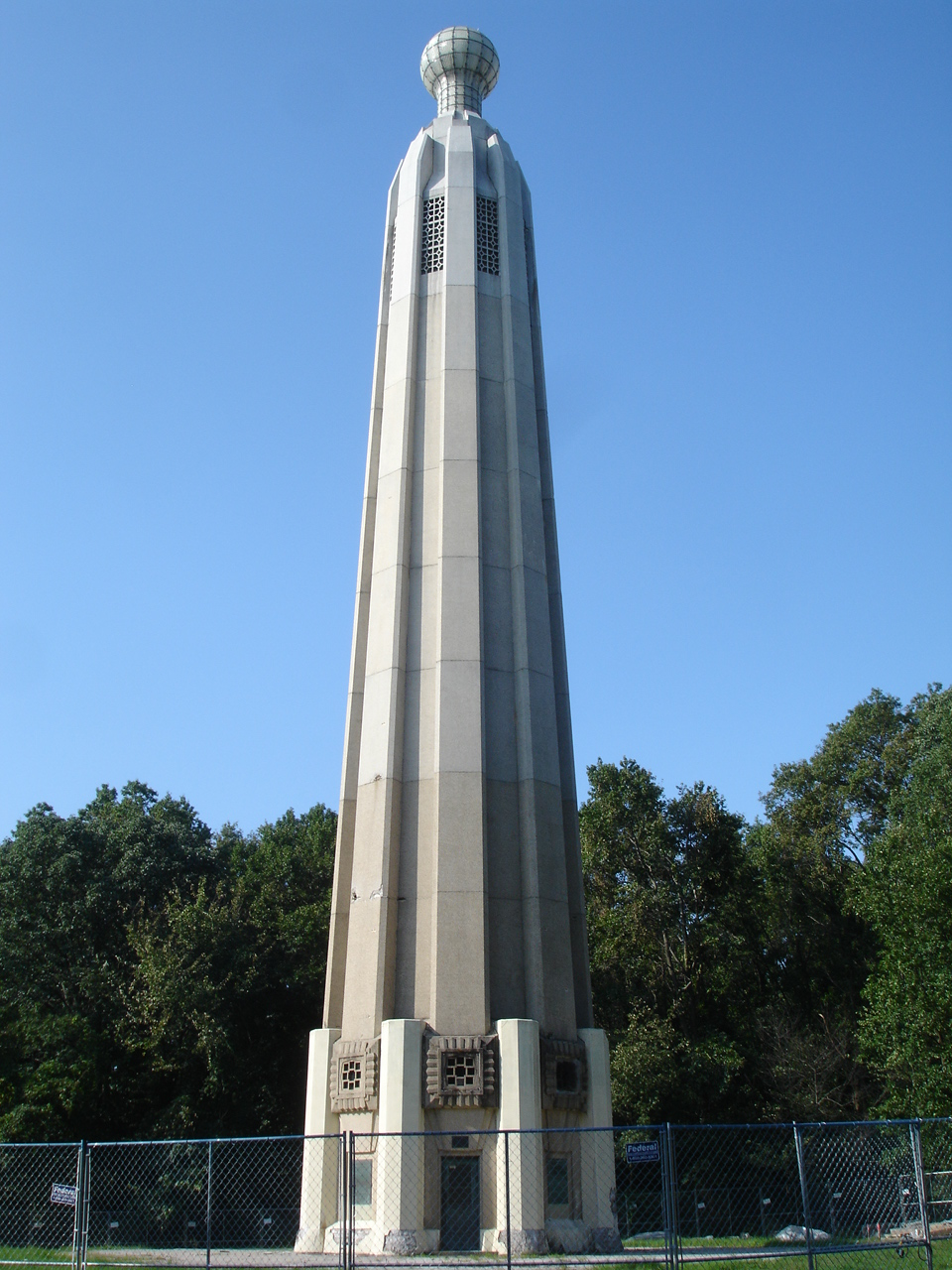
- The Edison Memorial Tower in 2011 while being restored

- Location within Middlesex County, New Jersey Location within New Jersey Location within the United States
- Location: 37 Christie Street, Edison, New Jersey
- Coordinates: 40°33′47″N 74°20′22″W
- Area: 3.4 acres (1.4 ha)
- Built: 1938
- Architect: Massena & DuPont
- Architectural style: Art Deco
- NRHP reference No.: 79001505
- NJRHP No.: 1836

Significant dates
- Added to NRHP: November 30, 1979
- Designated NJRHP: October 9, 1979

The Thomas Edison Center at Menlo Park features the Menlo Park Museum and Edison Memorial Tower as a memorial to inventor and businessman Thomas Alva Edison, located in the Menlo Park section of Edison, Middlesex County, New Jersey. The tower was dedicated on February 11, 1938, on what would have been the inventor's 91st birthday. The center is located at the 36-acre (15 ha) Edison State Park on Christie Street, the first street in the world to be lit up by a lightbulb, just off Lincoln Highway (Route 27), near the Metropark station of Amtrak and New Jersey Transit.

The Thomas Edison Center at Menlo Park is jointly administered by the New Jersey Department of Environmental Protection's Division of Parks and Forestry, the Township of Edison, and the non-profit Edison Memorial Tower Corporation.

== Site history ==
The research and development laboratory in Menlo Park was the first of its kind in the world. Edison came to Menlo Park in 1876. The area was then known as Raritan Township, and later changed (in 1954) to Edison Township. On October 22, 1879, Thomas Edison tested a bamboo filament which lasted over 30 hours, which was used to create the first successful incandescent light bulb. This accomplishment followed Edison's testing of over a thousand filaments in six months. Three years earlier, Thomas Edison tested his wax and tinfoil phonograph by recording and playing "Mary Had a Little Lamb". Thomas Edison improved Alexander Graham Bell's telephone using carbon. In addition, he invented an electric train and tested it on a track built around his laboratory, now coinciding with modern-day Christie Street and Route 27. Edison and his staff created 400 of his most important inventions here. It was this site that Edison fondly nicknamed his 'Invention Factory'.

Edison and his staff were working in New York City, building the world's first central distribution site for electricity, when his wife Mary Stilwell Edison died at their Menlo Park home. In 1887, when Thomas Edison needed a bigger laboratory closer to New York City, he moved his research laboratory to West Orange, New Jersey, which is now preserved as Thomas Edison National Historical Park.

By 1926 most of the buildings left in Menlo Park either burned down or collapsed, and the two surviving buildings, the glass shed and the Sarah Jordan Boarding House were moved by Henry Ford in 1929 to Greenfield Village in Dearborn, Michigan, now part of The Henry Ford museum. The remaining structure from the other buildings was used by Henry Ford to rebuild them in Greenfield Village, where they are still open today. Despite the fact that Edison's laboratory had fully been relocated, on May 16, 1925, John Leib, vice president of the New York Edison Company, dedicated a stone tablet and memorial at the intersection of Christie Street and Route 27 (Lincoln Highway), a gift from the State of New Jersey, with Thomas Edison, his wife Mina Miller Edison, and Governor George S. Silzer attending the event.

Planning for the Edison State Park began in 1931.

== Tower ==
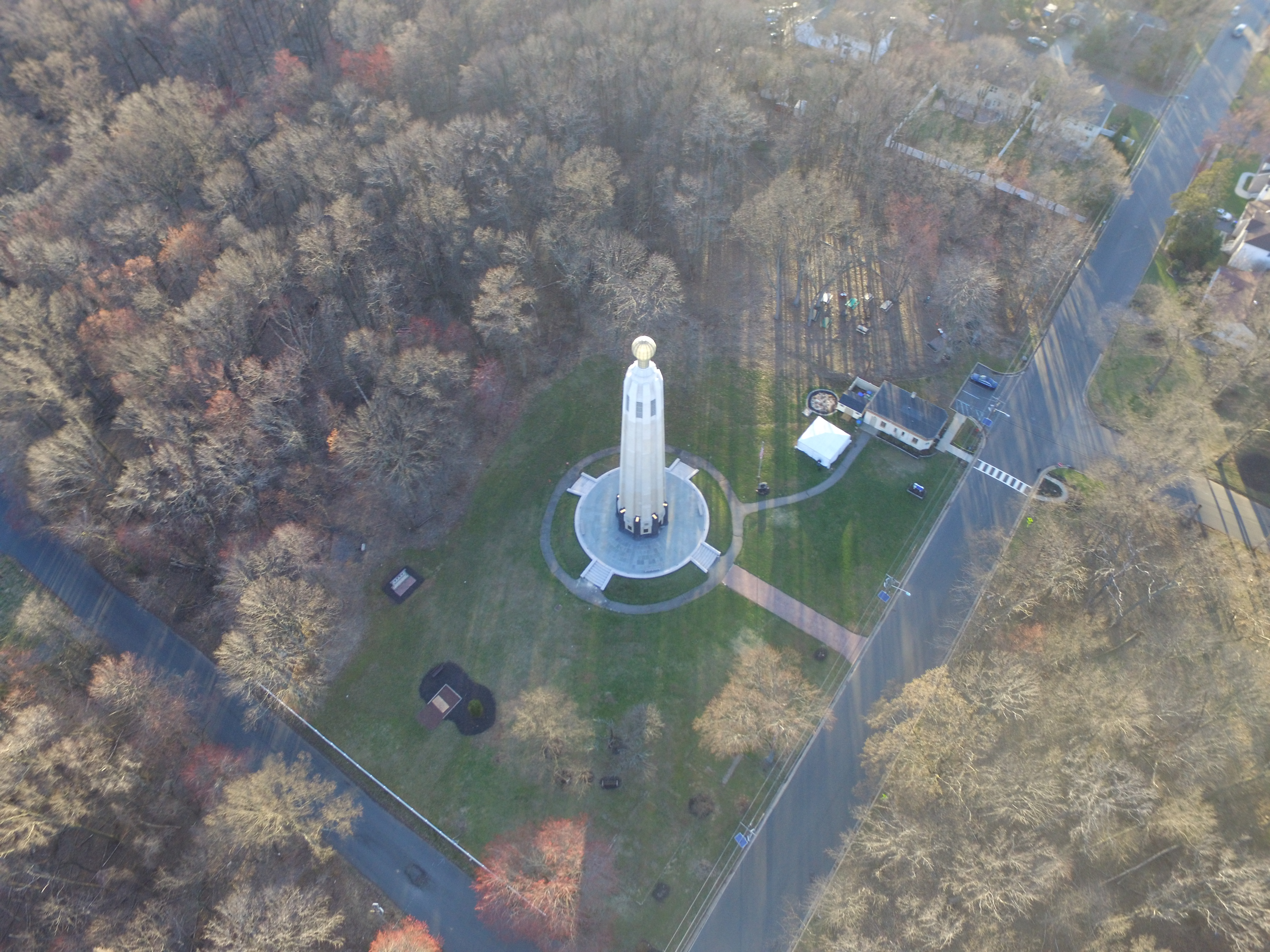
Overhead view of Thomas Edison Tower

On May 17, 1937, construction began on the Edison Tower, a new monument to Edison. A cornerstone ceremony with Charles Edison was held on July 1. On February 11, 1938, seven years after Edison's death, the 131 feet (40 m)-tall Art Deco tower was dedicated in honor of the Wizard of Menlo Park.

Its pinnacle is meant to represent an incandescent light bulb and originally included an audio system that according to a 2004 Weird NJ magazine could be heard from a distance of two miles. The American concrete pioneer John Joseph Earley was involved in its construction. The tower, which rises 131 feet above the Terrace, is topped by a 13' 8" foot high Bulb made of Pyrex segments by the Corning Corporation. The tower was added to the National Register of Historic Places on November 30, 1979, as an important architectural and commemorative landmark. It is also on the New Jersey Register of Historic Places.

Signs of deterioration appeared in September 1994 and the tower was closed a month later.

After it was put on the list of New Jersey's most endangered historic sites in 1997, the Edison Township Memorial Corporation started a $3.87 million renovation. The tower underwent restoration from 2011 to 2015. Concrete samples were taken off the facade and sent to a laboratory where they were tested for their specific makeup. This is so the recreated panels could match the old ones that do not need replacing.

The Edison Memorial Tower as depicted in the seal of the Township of Edison

The Centennial Plaque, which was stolen a number of years ago, was also replaced during the restoration. The lower part of the plaque was sent to a Metallurgist in order to match the color.

The restoration was completed in October 2015, and a re-dedication ceremony was held on October 24, 2015. The ceremony showed off the newly refurbished tower, media system which played music from the tower's construction until the 50s, grounds, and concluded with the relighting of the large light bulb at the top of the tower.

=== Light bulb ===
The sphere atop the tower had been called the "world's largest light bulb", however, in 2021, a larger light bulb, 17’ tall and 10’ in diameter, was installed in Tulsa, Oklahoma, on the plaza in front of the Cox Business Convention Center.

Another famous sphere, the Union Watersphere, long-known as the "world's tallest water sphere" is located in nearby Union.

== Museum ==
The original gatehouse for the tower evolved into a museum that opened on February 11, 1942, which would have been Edison's 95th birthday.

A small, two room museum houses a collection of Edison memorabilia such as historic light bulbs, phonographs, dynamos and portions of Edison's electric train test track. The museum showcases many of Thomas Edison's creations including the phonograph and many of his light bulbs, as well as memorabilia relating to Edison and his inventions. The museum also showcases many images taken of Edison's property, inventions, and family. On Christie Street, the world's first street lit by electric lights, there are several informative boards describing Menlo Park in the Edison Era.

The museum reopened after a renovation on June 9, 2012, with old and newly acquired artifacts and interactive activities.

Surrounding the two historic acres is a small forest with a couple trails. The forest features a small pond, a meadow, and several ravines which are visible from the trail.

== See also ==
- National Register of Historic Places listings in Middlesex County, New Jersey
