= William Symes Andrews =

English-born American electrical engineer (1847–1929)

- Born: September 10, 1847; England
- Died: July 1, 1929 (aged 81); Schenectady, New York, US

William Symes Andrews (September 10, 1847 – July 1, 1929) was an Edison Pioneer, electrical engineer, and one of the first employees of the General Electric Company.

== Biography ==
Andrews was born in Saltford, England on Sept. 10, 1847, the son of Bailey and Selina (Chesterton) Andrews. He started working at Edison's Menlo Park in Nov 1879. He died on July 1, 1929, in Schenectady, New York.

W.S. Andrews was made superintendent of Thomas Edison's Machine Works in NY i October 1881, becoming the chief electrical engineer of their central station construction company, Edison Electric Light Company in June 1883. He established more than 30 local Edison charging stations through 1886, including Sunbury PA, Rochester NY, Des Moines IA, Minnesota, New Orleans and Chicago. He continued in Edison General Electric.

He later joined the General Electric Company in Schenectady NY in 1894 after Edison had sold his stake in Edison General Electric to Elihu Thomson's Thomson/Houston, and became involved in X-ray testing. He often experimented on himself (left hand and upper face), and later became a victim of the radiation dangers that were not known at the time. Andrews can be seen in many photos with Thomas Edison and his fellow Edison Pioneer.
