= Charles Batchelor =

American inventor (1845–1910)

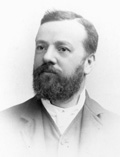
Charles W. Batchelor, inventor, associate of Thomas A. Edison, early executive of General Electric Company

Charles W. Batchelor (December 25, 1845 – January 1, 1910) was an inventor and close associate of American inventor Thomas Alva Edison during much of Edison's career. He was involved in some of the greatest inventions and technological developments in history.

== Biographical information ==
Charles Batchelor was born on Christmas Day, 1845, and raised in Manchester, England. He was a draftsman and machinist, and later on in his life he was Thomas Alva Edison's friend and right-hand man. In 1870, while working for a textile equipment manufacturer, he was sent to the United States to install some equipment in a Newark, New Jersey textile factory. At this time Thomas Edison's main laboratory and shop were also located in Newark where the two met. By the end of October 1871 Batchelor was working at Edison's American Telegraph Works, and by the summer of 1873 was assisting Edison in inventing.

Charles Batchelor became one of Edison's closest laboratory assistants and business partners during the 1870s and 1880s. He assisted Edison with some of his most important projects in the fields of telegraphy, telephony, the phonograph, and electric lighting.

As a gifted experimenter, he was Edison's "hands," testing, tinkering with, and improving the models and apparatus built for Edison by John Kruesi. In 1873, Edison named his friend "Batch" as "chief experimental assistant". Together Batchelor and Edison would come up with prospective products.

Edison also frequently entrusted him with responsibility for special projects. In 1879, he went to London to supervise technical operations of the Edison Telephone Company of Great Britain, but he became ill there and returned to Menlo Park. Two years later, Batchelor installed a model of an electrical lighting station for the 1881 International Exposition of Electricity in Paris. Batchelor stayed there for the next three years as manager of the Edison electric light companies that were established in France.

It was Edison's practice to give his key assistants shares in his companies and to let them invest in the business ventures that resulted from their inventive activity. Along with other Edison assistants such as Samuel Insull, John Kruesi, Francis Upton, and Edward H. Johnson, Batchelor was an investor in Edison manufacturing enterprises, beginning with the Edison Electric Light Company (1878), and continuing with the Edison Lamp Company (1880), the Edison Machine Works (1881), which Batchelor managed between 1884 through 1888, and the Edison General Electric Company (1888). It was through their positions as both investors and employees of these concerns, that Edison and his men derived much of their income.

While in Paris, Charles Batchelor also recognized the skills of a young engineer named Nikola Tesla. In 1884 when Batchelor was brought back to the US to manage the Edison Machine Works, he asked that Tesla be brought to the US as well.

In 1887, when Edison relocated his experimental laboratory to West Orange, New Jersey, Batchelor supervised the construction of the buildings. He later became "Treasurer and General Manager of the General Electric Company" (which succeeded the Edison General Electric Company in 1892). The General Electric Company grew to become one of the largest Fortune 500 companies in the United States.

Following his retirement from General Electric, Batchelor returned in 1899 to work for Edison Ore-Milling Company. After the failure of the ore-refining business (in which he was a large investor), Batchelor left Edison's employ to pursue work elsewhere. Their working relationship lasted thirty years. He traveled with his wife Rosanna and their daughters, worked selling securities, and eventually became president of Taylor Foundry Company.

At the time of his death on New Year's Day 1910 Batchelor was President of the Taylor Foundry Company.

== Honors ==
Charles Batchelor is remembered through named professorships in electrical engineering at Columbia University. The current Charles Batchelor Professors of Electrical Engineering are Dimitris Anastassiou and Keren Bergman.

== Biographies ==
- Welch, Walter L. (1972). Charles Batchelor: Edison's chief partner. Syracuse, NY: Syracuse University. OCLC 475205171.
