= John Kruesi =

Swiss-American machinist (1843 – 1899)

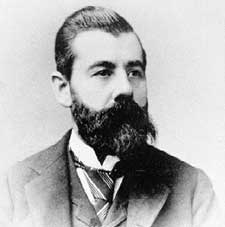
John Kruesi

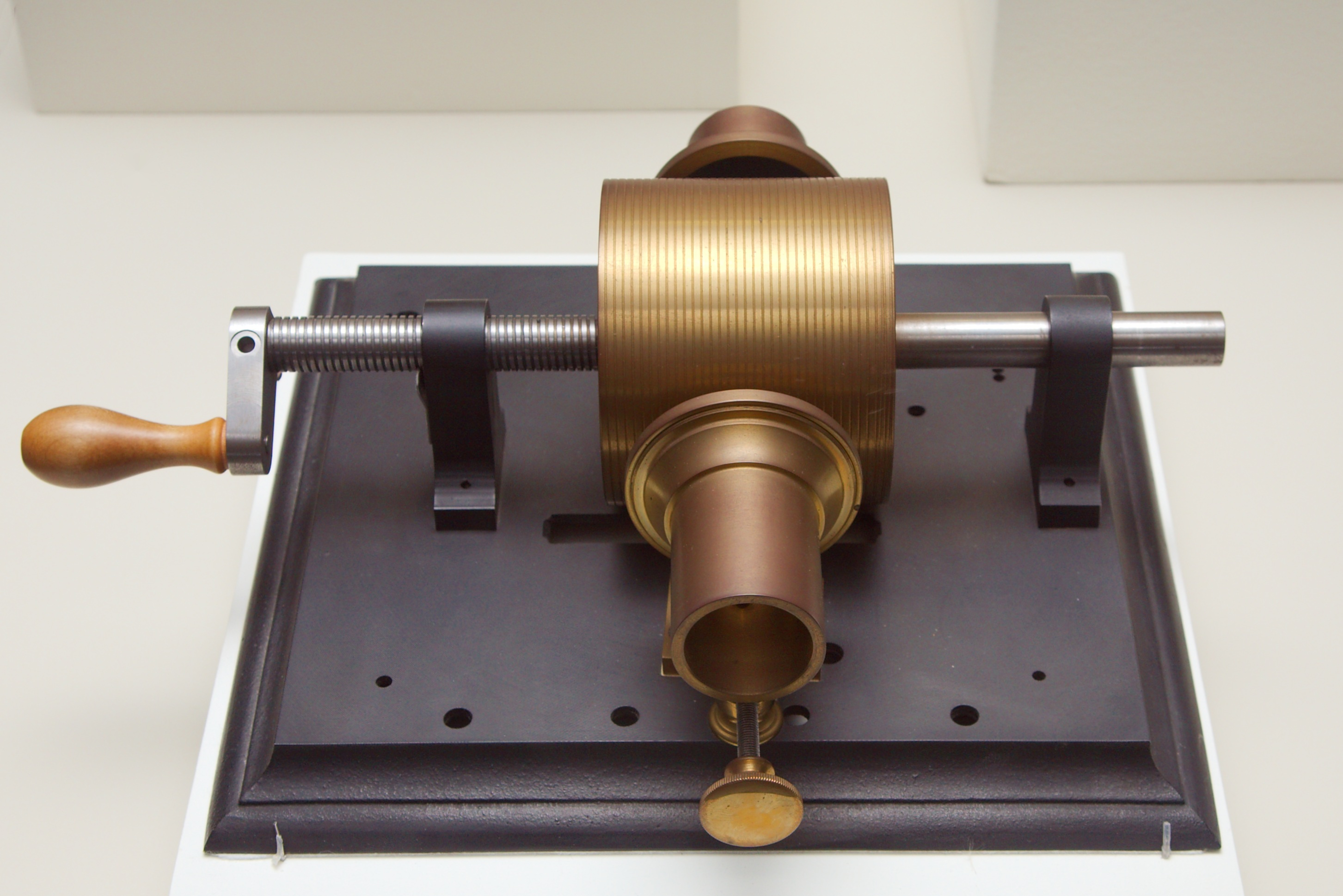
Replica of a Kruesi/Edison tinfoil phonograph.

John Kruesi (Johann Heinrich Krüsi, May 15, 1843 – February 22, 1899) was a Swiss-born machinist, and close associate of Thomas Edison. His great-grandson was Bill Brock.

== Career ==
John Kruesi had been apprenticed as a locksmith in Switzerland, and migrated to the United States in 1870 where he settled in Newark, New Jersey. There, he met Thomas Edison. Edison employed him for his workshop in 1872.

Kruesi became Edison's head machinist through his Newark and Menlo Park periods, responsible for translating Edison's numerous rough sketches into working devices. Since constructing and testing models was central to Edison's method of inventing, Kruesi's skill in doing this was critical to Edison's success as an inventor. Historians Robert Friedel and Paul Israel summed up Kruesi's remarkable ability of this:

If the devices that emerged [from Kruesi's workshop] didn't work, it was because they were bad ideas, not because they were badly made. And when the ideas were good, as in the case of the phonograph, the product of Kruesi's shop would prove it.

Kruesi was also involved in many of Edison's key inventions. Including the quadruplex telegraph, the carbon microphone, phonograph, incandescent light bulb and system of electric lighting.

With the development of Edison's system of electric lighting, Kruesi moved to more management positions. In 1881, Edison put Kruesi in charge of the Edison Electric Tube Company, making him responsible for the installation of underground power distribution cables from the central generating station. Kruesi was also an inventor, while at the Electric Tube Company, he devised a two wire conduit in which two semicircular conductors were separated by an insulator and covered in insulating material. Kruesi became assistant general manager of the lower Manhattan Edison Machine Works in 1894. The Edison Machine Works moved to Schenectady, NY in 1886 and was merged into Edison General Electric in 1889. When that company merged with several others to form General Electric Company in 1892, Kruesi was promoted to General Manager, and then to Chief Mechanical Engineer at the Schenectady site in 1896.
