= Grosvenor Lowrey =

American lawyer

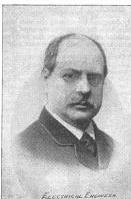

Grosvenor P. Lowrey (September 25, 1831 – April 21, 1893) was a 19th-century American corporate lawyer who served as counsel to numerous powerful interests such as Thomas Edison, Western Union, Wells Fargo and the New York Metropolitan Railway Company.

After graduating from Lafayette College in 1854 Lowrey was admitted to the bar he became the personal secretary to his former teacher Andrew Horatio Reeder, the first Governor of the Kansas Territory. Lowery aligned himself with the abolitionist Free-Stater wing of the Kansas Territory government, but was forced to return east when the Border Ruffian elements gained control of the legislature.

Lowrey later worked for the Fremont Campaign of 1856 and during the Civil War wrote pamphlets defending President Abraham Lincoln's expanded war powers while doing legal work for the Treasury Department.

After the war he worked for various clients, being employed as general counsel for Western Union for 15 years, while being hired on the side for numerous merges and consolations in the period. However his most famous work was defending Edison's quadruplex telegraph and incandescent light bulb patents. Lowrey was also instrumental in the formation of the Edison Electric Light Company, and convinced J.P. Morgan to back it.

He died on April 21, 1893, in New York at his Madison Avenue home from complications of gout.
