= Menlo Park, New Jersey =

Community in New Jersey, US

- Unincorporated community
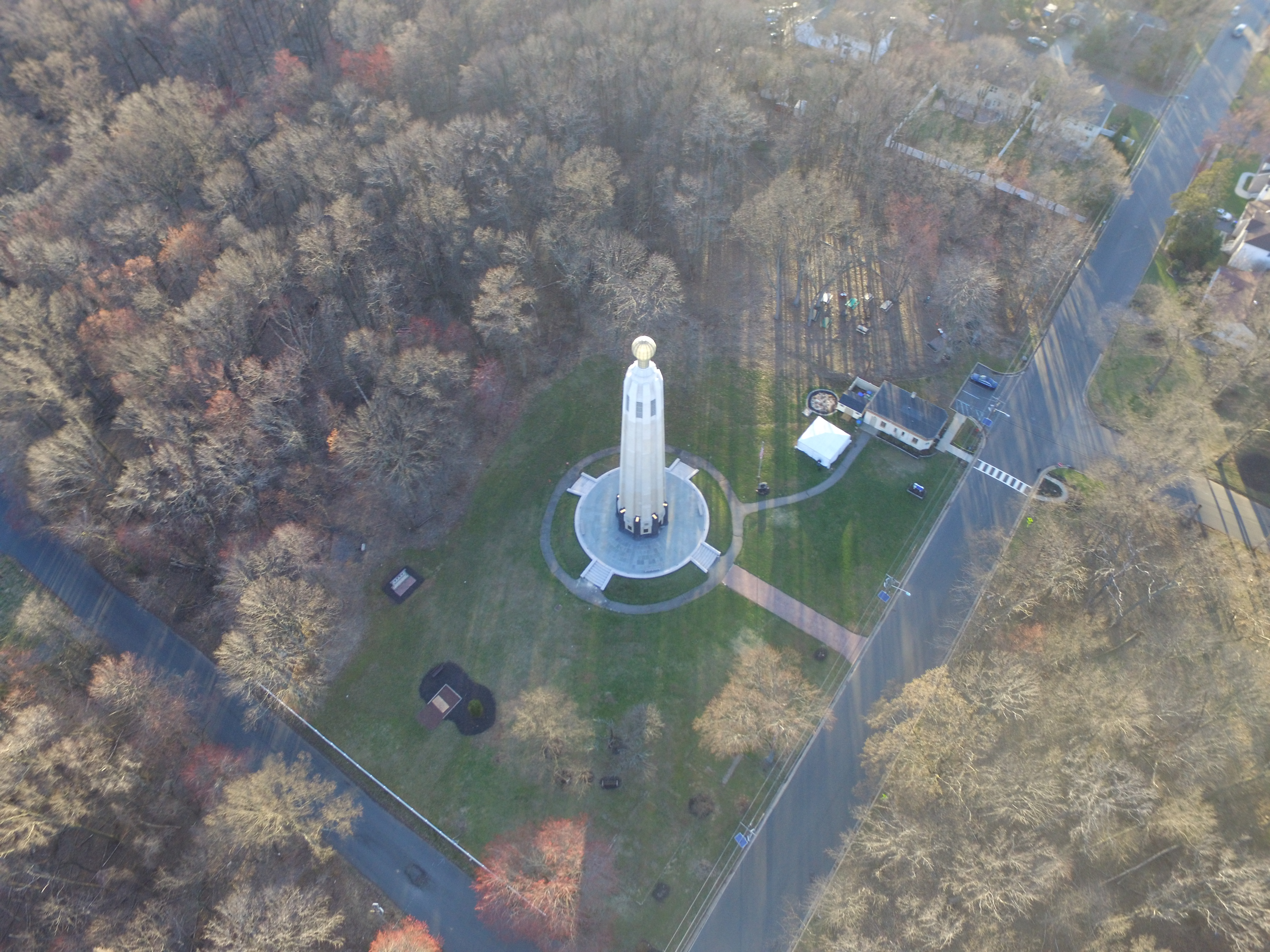
- Thomas Edison Memorial Tower in the Menlo Park neighborhood

- Location of Menlo Park in Middlesex County Inset: Location of county within the state of New Jersey Menlo Park (New Jersey) Menlo Park (the United States)
- Coordinates: 40°33′54″N 74°20′15″W
- Country: United States
- State: New Jersey
- County: Middlesex
- Township: Edison
- Elevation: 141 ft (43 m)
- GNIS feature ID: 878259

Menlo Park is an unincorporated community within Edison Township in Middlesex County, in the U.S. state of New Jersey.

In 1876, Thomas Edison set up his home and research laboratory in Menlo Park, at the time an unsuccessful real estate development named after the town of Menlo Park, California. In this lab, which was one of the first to pursue practical, commercial applications of research, Edison invented the phonograph and developed a commercially viable incandescent light bulb filament. Christie Street in Menlo Park was one of the first streets in the world to use electric lights for illumination. In 1887, Edison moved his home and laboratory to West Orange. After his death, the Thomas Alva Edison Memorial Tower and Museum was constructed near his old Menlo Park lab and dedicated in 1938. Edison's old lab site and memorial now make up Edison State Park.

The municipality in which Menlo Park is located, which was called "Raritan Township" while Edison was alive, was renamed to Edison Township on November 10, 1954.

== See also ==
- List of neighborhoods in Edison, New Jersey
