= List of Johns Hopkins University people =

This is a list of people affiliated with Johns Hopkins University, an American university located in Baltimore, Maryland.

The Johns Hopkins Alumni Association defines eligibility for membership as follows:

The Johns Hopkins Alumni Association defines Johns Hopkins alumni as those individuals who have received a formal degree from Johns Hopkins, including Bachelors, Masters, and Doctorate degrees.

Certificate holders, CTY alumni, post-baccalaureate attendees, and Peabody Prep alumni are not considered alumni of the university by the Johns Hopkins Alumni Association.

== Notable alumni ==
=== Nobel laureates ===
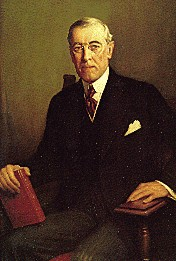
Woodrow Wilson, 28th president of the United States from 1913 to 1921 and Nobel Peace Prize laureate, was awarded a Ph.D in government and history from Johns Hopkins in 1886.

- Peter Agre – Nobel Prize in Physiology or Medicine, 2003
- Christian B. Anfinsen – Nobel Prize in Chemistry, 1972
- Richard Axel – Nobel Prize in Medicine, 2004
- Joseph Erlanger – Nobel Prize in Medicine, 1944
- Andrew Fire – Nobel Prize in Medicine, 2006
- Robert Fogel – Nobel Prize in Economics, 1993
- James Franck – Nobel Prize in Physics, 1925
- Herbert Spencer Gasser – Nobel Prize in Physiology, 1944
- Riccardo Giacconi – Nobel Prize in Physics, 2002
- Maria Goeppert-Mayer – Nobel Prize in Physics, 1963
- Paul Greengard – Nobel Prize in Medicine, 2000
- Carol W. Greider – Nobel Prize in Medicine, 2009
- Haldan Keffer Hartline – Nobel Prize in Medicine, 1967
- David H. Hubel – Nobel Prize in Medicine, 1981
- William G. Kaelin Jr. – Nobel Prize in Physiology or Medicine, 2019
- Simon Kuznets – Nobel Prize in Economics, 1971
- Merton H. Miller – Nobel Prize in Economics, 1990
- Thomas Hunt Morgan – Nobel Prize in Medicine, 1933
- Daniel Nathans – Nobel Prize in Medicine, 1978
- Adam Riess – Nobel Prize in Physics, 2011
- Martin Rodbell – Nobel Prize in Medicine, 1994
- Francis Peyton Rous – Nobel Prize in Medicine, 1966
- Shimon Sakaguchi – Nobel Prize in Medicine, 2025
- Gregg L. Semenza – Nobel Prize in Physiology or Medicine, 2019
- Hamilton O. Smith – Nobel Prize in Medicine, 1978
- Vincent du Vigneaud – Nobel Prize in Chemistry, 1955
- George Hoyt Whipple – Nobel Prize in Medicine, 1934
- Torsten Wiesel – Nobel Prize in Medicine, 1981
- Jody Williams – Nobel Peace Prize, 1997
- Woodrow Wilson – president of the United States, Nobel Peace Prize, 1919

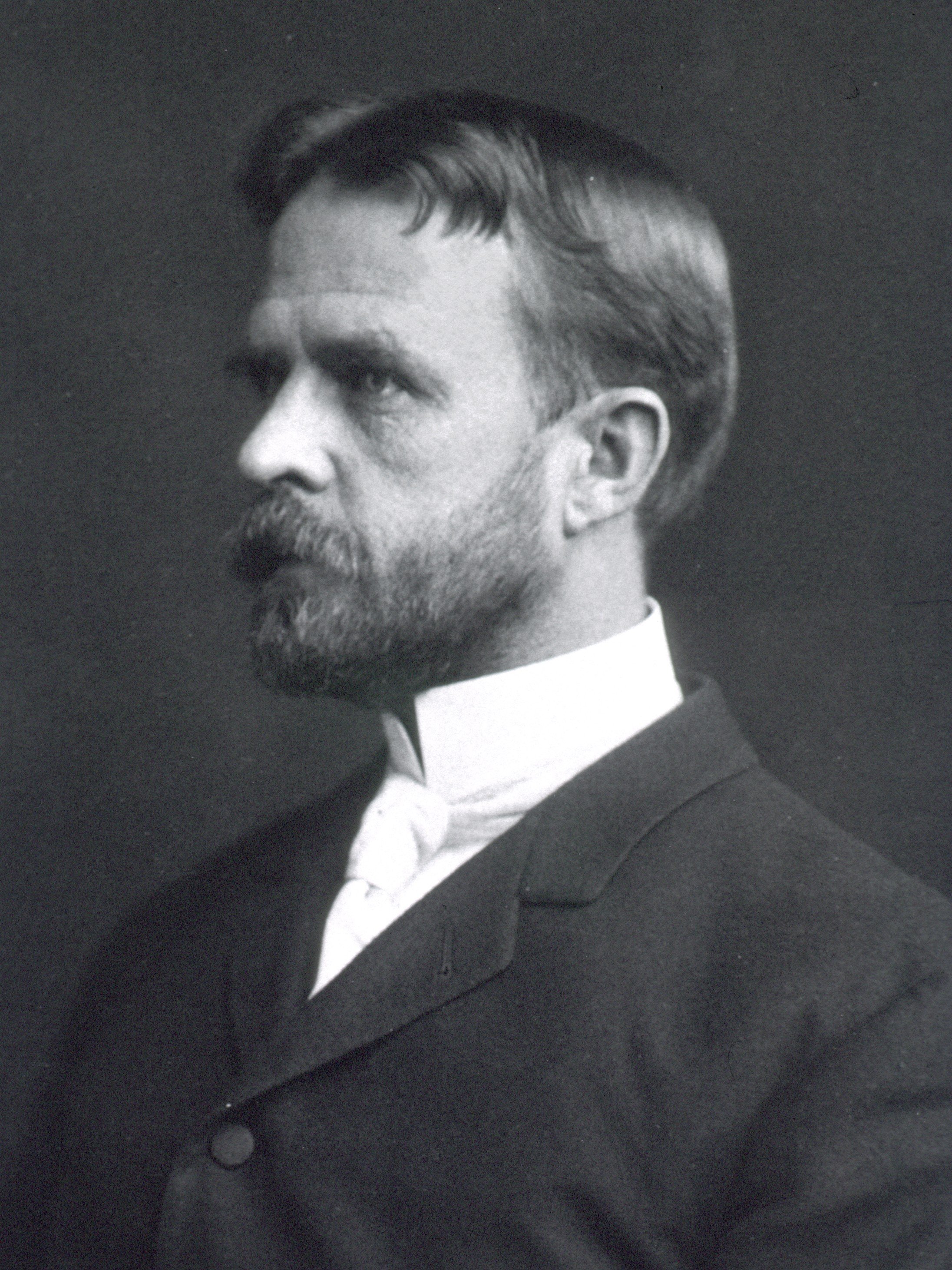
Thomas Hunt Morgan, who received the Nobel Prize in Physiology or Medicine in 1933 for his discovery that chromosomes carrying genetic material were the basis for heredity, earned his Ph.D. in Zoology from Johns Hopkins in 1890

=== Academia, science, medicine and technology ===
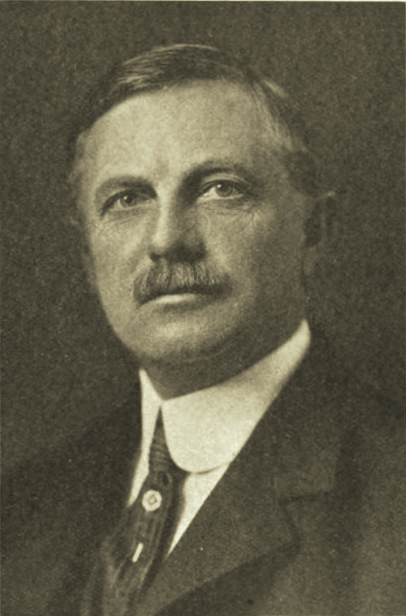
Frederick Jackson Turner, noted historian of the American West best known for his influential "frontier thesis," earned his Ph.D. in history from Johns Hopkins in 1890

- William Foxwell Albright – authenticator of the Dead Sea Scrolls, linguist, expert on ceramics
- Hattie Alexander – pediatrician and microbiologist
- John August Anderson – astronomer
- Jack Andraka – cancer researcher; as a high school student, developed new test for detecting pancreatic cancer early
- Lynne M. Angerer – developmental biologist
- Richard T. Antoun – Professor Emeritus of Anthropology at Binghamton University
- John W. Ayers (Ph.D. 2011) – behavioral epidemiologist
- Betsy Bang – biologist
- Fred Bang – developed the Limulus amebocyte lysate (LAL) test for bacterial endotoxins
- David P. Baker – sociologist
- Florence Bascom – geologist
- Richard E. Bellman – applied mathematician; inventor of dynamic programming
- Harold H. Bender – professor of philology at Princeton University
- Michael T. Benson – president of West Virginia University
- Vinod Bhakuni – biophysicist, Shanti Swarup Bhatnagar and N-BIOS laureate
- Frederick S. Billig – scramjet and hypersonics pioneer
- Lewis E. Braverman (Ph.D. 1955) – chief of endocrinology at Boston University
- David S. Bredt – neuroscientist, professor and research leader in pharmaceutical companies
- Rachel Brem – diagnostic radiologist, technologies for diagnosis of breast cancer
- Jay Clark Brown – Professor Emeritus in the Department of microbiology, immunology, and cancer biology at the University of Virginia School of Medicine
- J. Prentiss Browne – architect
- Hilde Bruch – Professor of Psychiatry at Baylor College of Medicine in Houston, expert on eating disorders
- Howard Bruenn (M.D. 1929) – personal physician of President Franklin D. Roosevelt
- Ernesto Bustamante (Ph.D. 1978, School of Medicine) – biochemist, molecular biologist, former Chief of the National Institute of Health of Peru
- Kim Butler – historian and author
- Hugh Grosvenor Calkins, Catherine Ellen Poindexter Professor of Cardiology
- Schuyler V. Cammann (Ph.D. 1949) – anthropologist
- Lisa A. Carey – distinguished professor in Breast Cancer Research
- David Celentano – epidemiologist
- Chi-Chao Chan – ophthalmologist
- Samuel Charache, hematologist, discovered the first treatment for sickle cell disease
- Dipankar Chatterji – Indian molecular biologist and Padma Shri recipient
- Harold F. Cherniss – noted historian of ancient philosophy
- William Chomsky – scholar of Hebrew and Judaic studies, father of Noam Chomsky
- Roger A. Coate – political scientist, former professor at the University of South Carolina
- Denton Cooley – cardiovascular surgeon
- Mary Croughan – epidemiologist and academic administrator
- John Dewey – philosopher, psychologist, and educational reformer
- William H. Dobelle – biomedical researcher
- Wendell E. Dunn – educator and principal of Forest Park High School
- G. Roger Edwards – archaeologist
- Jessica Einhorn – Dean of SAIS, managing director of the World Bank
- Daniel Eisenberg (B.A.) – Distinguished Research Professor of Spanish at Florida State University
- Luther P. Eisenhart – mathematician, theoretical physicist
- Joel Elkes – psychopharmaceutical researcher
- Adam Falk – President of Williams College
- James M. Farr – President of the University of Florida
- Emanuel Feldman – rabbi emeritus of Congregation Beth Jacob of Atlanta
- John Charles Fields – mathematician, established Fields Medal
- Karen Fleming – biophysicist known for membrane protein thermodynamics
- Abraham Flexner – educator, reformer of medical and higher education in the United States and Canada, author of the Flexner Report, founder of the Institute for Advanced Study
- Harry Frankfurt – moral philosopher; professor emeritus at Princeton University; known for work on free will and moral responsibility
- Linda P. Fried – geriatrician and epidemiologist, dean of Columbia University’s Mailman School of Public Health
- Hall Gardner –- Professor of International Politics at the American University of Paris
- William K. George – fluid dynamicist
- George Otto Gey – scientist, propagated the HeLa cell line, inventor of the roller drum
- Steven Gitomer – electrical engineer
- Sherita Hill Golden – Hugh P. McCormick Family Professor of Endocrinology and Metabolism
- Solomon W. Golomb – mathematician, invented the Golomb coding and Golomb ruler
- George Gorse (B.A. 1971) – Viola Horton Professor of Art History, Pomona College
- Harry Clinton Gossard – geometer, discoverer of the Gossard perspector of a triangle
- Linda Grant DePauw – modern historian, retired university teacher, non-fiction author, journal editor
- Duane Graveline – astronaut
- Michael Griffin – NASA administrator
- Adolf Guttmacher – rabbi
- Amita Gupta - Dr. Florence Sabin Professor of Medicine
- Abner McGehee Harvey – head of the Johns Hopkins Medical School, 1946–1973
- Rigoberto Hernandez – chemist and diversity advocate
- Frank Irving Herriott – PhD (1893)
- Arthur Hertzberg – rabbi
- L. Emmett Holt Jr. – pediatrician
- Jason Huang – neurosurgeon
- Ru-Chih Chow Huang – biochemist
- Elmer Huerta – physician and health communicator
- Grover Hutchins – pathologist
- Ray Hyman – Professor Emeritus of Psychology at the University of Oregon, author, magician and a noted critic of parapsychology
- James H. Hyslop (1854–1920) – professor of ethics and logic at Columbia University; psychical researcher; secretary-treasurer of the American Society for Psychical Research
- Jose Itzigsohn – professor of sociology at Brown University
- Robert J. K. Jacob – computer scientist; professor at Tufts University
- Kimberly S. Johnson (1997) – professor of medicine at Duke University
- Kate Breckenridge Karpeles (1887–1941) (1914) – U. S. Army doctor during World War I
- Kenneth H. Keller – Director of the SAIS Bologna Center, former President of the University of Minnesota system
- Cornelius M. Kerwin – President of American University
- Charles Rollin Keyes – geologist
- David W. Kennedy, emeritus professor at the University of Pennsylvania
- Steven Knapp – President of George Washington University
- Susan Kolb – medical doctor and author
- Christine Ladd-Franklin – scientist and logician
- Hey-Kyoung Lee – neuroscience professor
- Steven Lehrer – medical researcher and writer
- Bruce Lerman – cardiologist; Chief of the Division of Cardiology and Director of the Cardiac Electrophysiology Laboratory at Weill Cornell Medicine and the New York Presbyterian Hospital
- Lin Ruey-shiung (1977) – Taiwanese physician and professor of public health; professor emeritus and former dean (1993–1996) of the College of Public Health, National Taiwan University; minor vice presidential candidate in 2012
- Gerald E. Loeb – neurophysiologist, biomedical engineer, academic
- Willis Maddrey – internist and hepatologist
- Patrick Maggitti – first provost of Villanova University and former dean of the Villanova School of Business
- George V. Mann – medical researcher and physician
- Thomas H. Maren – inventor of the drug Trusopt
- Howard Markel – pediatrician and historian of medicine
- John Mauchly – co-inventor of the ENIAC Computer
- Michael Merzenich – professor emeritus neuroscientist, brain researcher, CEO Scientific Learning, Posit Science
- Maynard Mayo Metcalf, biologist and zoologist, gained his doctorate here in 1893 and was a research associat here from 1926 to 1933
- Tanya Moore – biostatistician and STEM activist
- Bessie Moses – gynecologist and obstetrician
- Yūjirō Motora – psychologist
- Mike Muuss – author of Ping
- Etheldreda Nakimuli-Mpungu – psychiatrist and epidemiologist
- George Nemhauser – operations researcher; A. Russell Chandler III Chair and Institute Professor of Industrial and Systems Engineering at the Georgia Institute of Technology; former president of the Operations Research Society of America
- Michael J. Neufeld – historian, curator of the Smithsonian National Air and Space Museum
- Frank Oppenheimer – physicist, worked on the Manhattan Project
- James Morris Page – mathematician, dean and chairman of University of Virginia
- Andre Francis Palmer – chemical engineer and associate dean
- Nita Patel – research scientist who led the development of the Novavax COVID-19 vaccine
- Orra Almira Phelps (1927) – Navy physician, botanist, naturalist, mountaineer, and writer
- Fernando Picó (Ph.D. 1970) – historian, Jesuit priest, expert on the history of Puerto Rico
- Charles Lane Poor – astronomer
- Richard S. Potember – inventor and engineer
- Kanury Venkata Subba Rao – immunologist, Shanti Swarup Bhatnagar (1997) laureate
- Ann Reid – science education advocate
- Nicholas P. Restifo – tumor immunology and immunotherapy
- Justin B. Ries (Ph.D. 2005) – geoscientist and inventor known for discoveries in the field of global oceanic change
- Thomas Milton Rivers – virologist, United States Navy Admiral
- Arye Rosen – electrical engineer
- Jonathan Rosenblatt – rabbi
- Saurabh Saha – cancer researcher
- Tobias Schanfarber – rabbi
- Ozer Schild (1930–2006) – Danish-born Israeli academic, president of the University of Haifa and president of the College of Judea and Samaria ("Ariel College")
- Eitan Schwarz + psychiatrist
- Gail G. Shapiro – pediatric allergist
- Mark Shelhamer – Professor of Otolaryngology, head and neck surgery
- Tobin Siebers – Co-chair of the Initiative on Disability Studies and V.L. Parrington Collegiate Professor at the University of Michigan
- William M. Sinton – astronomer at Harvard University
- Louise L. Sloan – ophthalmologist and vision scientist
- Clifford V. Smith, Jr. – fourth chancellor of University of Wisconsin–Milwaukee
- Aage B. Sørensen – sociologist
- Gabrielle M. Spiegel – historian of the Middle Ages; former President of the American Historical Association
- Flora E. Strout – teacher, social reformer
- Laura Sumner – numismatist
- Harry L. Swinney – physicist, Director of the Center for Nonlinear Dynamics at the University of Texas at Austin
- Ibrahim B. Syed – radiologist
- Morris Tanenbaum – physical chemist, developed the first working silicon transistor on January 26, 1954
- Erika Moore Taylor – biomedical engineer, assistant professor at University of Florida, Mentor
- Michael E. Thomas – professor of industrial engineering, former acting president of the Georgia Institute of Technology
- Amytis Towfighi – Associate Professor of Neurology
- Frederick Jackson Turner – historian
- Robert Ulanowicz – theoretical ecologist
- Thorstein Veblen – economist, author, The Theory of the Leisure Class
- Selwyn M. Vickers – president and CEO, Memorial Sloan Kettering Cancer Center
- Heather Wakelee – professor of oncology at Stanford University Medical Center, Merit Award recipient from the American Society of Clinical Oncology
- George W. Ward – third principal of Maryland State Normal School (now Towson University)
- John B. Watson – psychologist
- Gabriel P. Weisberg (M.A. 1966, Ph.D. 1967) – Professor of Art History Emeritus, University of Minnesota
- Morris A. Wessel – pediatrician, pioneer of hospice care, discoverer of colic
- Henry S. West – fourth principal of Maryland State Normal School (now Towson University)
- John Archibald Wheeler – physicist, graduate advisor to Richard Feynman and Kip Thorne, coined the term "black hole"
- Reid Wiseman – NASA astronaut part of Expedition 40 and commander of Artemis II
- Maria Torrence Wishart – Canadian medical illustrator and the founder of the University of Toronto's Art as Applied to Medicine program
- Abel Wolman – inventor of modern water treatment techniques
- Bang Wong – creative director of the Broad Institute at MIT and Harvard University
- Frank H. Wu – Chancellor and Dean of UC Hastings College of the Law; law professor; author
- John H. Yardley – pathologist
- Frederick Yeh – biologist and animal welfare activist
- Rose Zetzer – first woman admitted to the Maryland State Bar Association
- Katharina T. Kraus – professor of philosophy

=== Athletics ===
- Louis Clarke – Olympic track champion
- Holly Clarke, distance runner and coach
- Andy Enfield – Southern Methodist University men's basketball head coach
- Henry Homer Gessler – Major League Baseball player, 1903–1911
- Kyle Harrison – three-time All-American lacrosse player at JHU and Major League Lacrosse player
- Davey Johnson – Major League Baseball player and manager
- Marc Kligman – sports agent and criminal lawyer
- Andrea Leand (MBA) – professional tennis player
- Dave Pietramala – University of North Carolina Men's Lacrosse defensive coordinator, former Johns Hopkins lacrosse coach
- Paul Rabil – All-American lacrosse player and MLL Most Valuable Player; co-founder of the Premier Lacrosse League.
- William C. Schmeisser – "Father Bill", National Lacrosse Hall of Fame inductee
- Robert H. Scott – Johns Hopkins lacrosse coach, athletic director, author
- John Thomas – Led lacrosse team to a 34–6 record during his time at JHU
- John Tucker – head coach of Washington Bayhawks professional lacrosse team
- Wes Unseld Jr. – Washington Wizards head basketball coach
- Joanna Zeiger (born 1970) -–Olympic and world champion triathlete, and author
- Don Zimmerman – UMBC lacrosse coach

=== Business ===
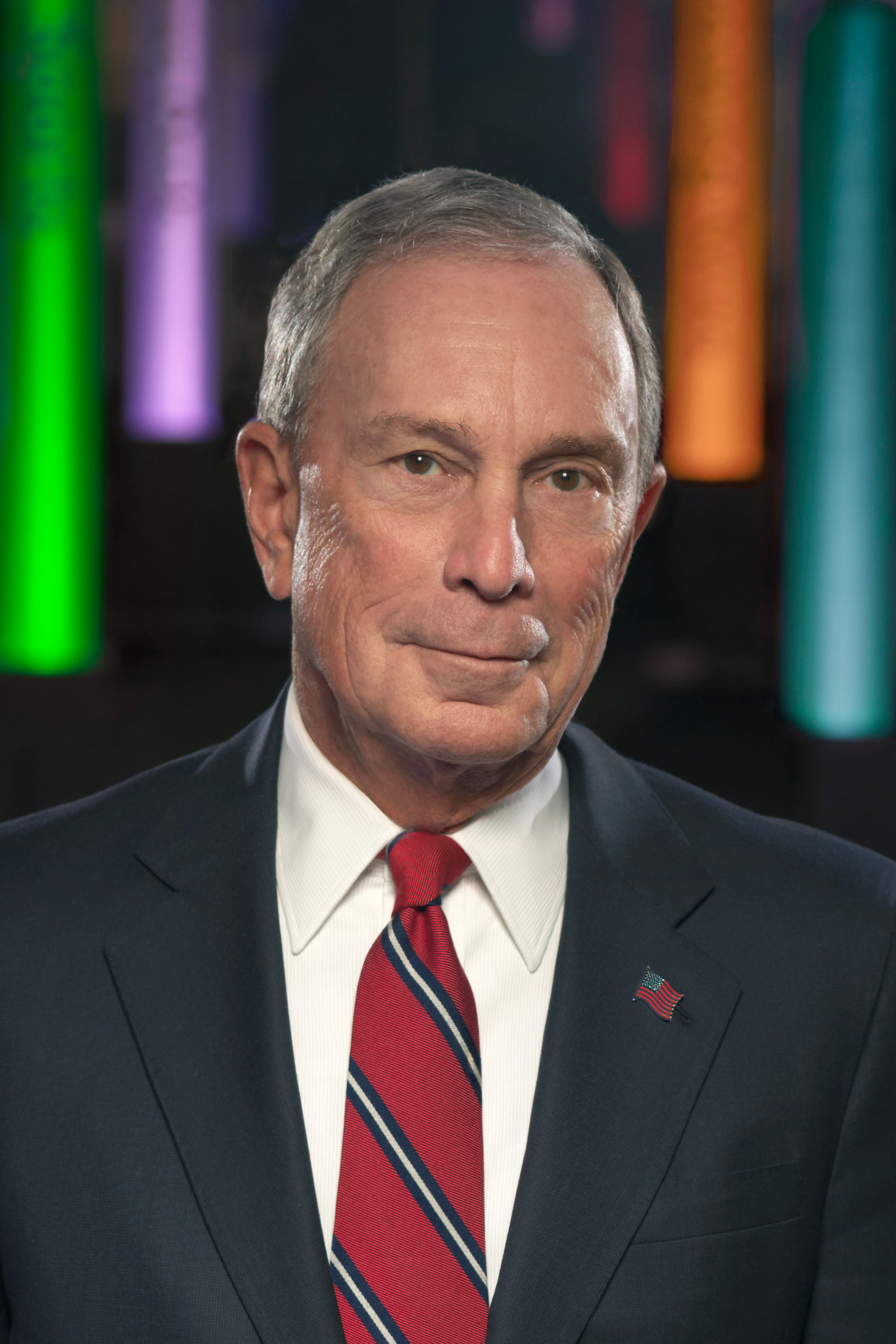
Michael Bloomberg, former Mayor of New York City

- Sanju Bansal (M.S. 1990) – co-founder of MicroStrategy
- Scott M. Black – founder of Delphi Management
- Michael Bloomberg (B.S. 1964) – founder of Bloomberg L.P., Mayor of New York City
- Timothy F. Geithner (M.A. 1985) – chairman of Warburg Pincus; former United States Secretary of the Treasury
- Amy Compton-Phillips (M.D., 1985) – former president of Clinical Care for Providence St. Joseph Health
- David S. Cordish (B.A. 1960, M.L.A 1965) – real estate developer, chairman and CEO of the Cordish Company
- Paul L. Cordish – attorney and businessman, former member of the Maryland House of Delegates and founder of the Cordish Law Firm, serving as the legal arm of the Cordish Company
- Ina Drew – former Chief Investment Officer of J.P. Morgan
- George Wackenhut (M.Ed.) – founder of G4S Secure Solutions (originally the Wackenhut Corporation), former chairman and CEO
- Robert H. Krieble (Ph.D. 1939) – co-founder and former chairman and CEO of Loctite Corporation
- Ajit Mohan (M.A.) – former CEO of Hotstar; former president of Asia-Pacific at Snap Inc.
- Chung Mong-joon (Ph.D.) – former president of Hyundai Heavy Industries; controlling shareholder of Hyundai Heavy Industries Group
- Naneen Neubohn (M.A. 1964) – former managing director of Morgan Stanley; former head of its London office and European Debt Capital Markets
- Arie L. Kopelman (B.A. 1960) – former president and chief operating officer of Chanel
- Ravinder Dhallan (M.D., Ph.D.) – chairman and CEO of Ravgen
- Frances Murphy Draper (M.Ed. 1973) – former president of Baltimore Afro-American
- Kathy Matsui (M.A. 1990) – general partner of MPower Partners; former vice chair and chief Japan strategist of Goldman Sachs Japan
- Michael Stewart – former chairman and president of United Artists Music Group
- Jim Wilkinson (M.S.) – chairman and CEO of TrailRunner International; former senior vice president and head of international corporate affairs at Alibaba Group
- Robert S. Silberman (M.A. 1990) – former president and chief operating officer of CalEnergy; former chairman and CEO of Strayer Education
- Morris Tanenbaum (B.A. 1949) – former president and CEO of AT&T Communications; former vice chairman and CFO of AT&T Corporation
- Clifton R. Wharton Jr. (M.A. 1948) – former chairman and CEO of TIAA-CREF
- Morris W. Offit (B.A. 1957) – founder of OFFITBANK; chairman and managing member of Offit Capital Advisors
- Jeffrey H. Aronson (B.A. 1980) – co-founder and managing principal of Centerbridge Partners
- Patrick Dumont (B.S.) – chairman and CEO of Las Vegas Sands; governor of the Dallas Mavericks
- David Gibbs (B.S. 1985) – former CEO of Yum! Brands
- Willard Hackerman (B.S. 1938) – longtime president and CEO of The Whiting-Turner Contracting Company
- Barclay Knapp (B.A. 1979) – co-founder and former CEO of NTL Incorporated
- John O. Agwunobi (M.P.H.) – former CEO and executive chairman of Herbalife
- Mary Zappone (B.S. 1986) – CEO of Sundyne
- Henry Gantt – eponymous designer of the Gantt chart
- Jeff Greene – real estate entrepreneur
- John Hewson – chairman of General Security Australia Insurance Brokers Pty Ltd
- David M. Hoffman – CEO of Internews Network
- Terry Keenan (B.A., A&S 1983) – business columnist for the New York Post, anchor for CNN
- Shahal M. Khan – owner of Plaza Hotel and venture capitalist
- Jeong H. Kim – president of Bell Labs
- Rahmi Koç – chairman of Koç Holding, Turkey's largest and oldest conglomerate
- Robert Lawrence Kuhn – corporate strategist, investment banker, adviser to Chinese leaders
- Sol Kumin (B.A. 1999) – founder of Folger Hill Asset Management; philanthropist; winning thoroughbred racehorse owner
- Barry Lowenkron (M.S. '77) – Vice President of Global Security & Sustainability, MacArthur Foundation
- Edmund C. Lynch (B.A. 1907) – co-founder of Merrill Lynch
- Patrick Maggitti, PhD (MBA 2002) – first provost of Villanova University, former dean of the Villanova School of Business
- Peter Magowan – owner of the San Francisco Giants and CEO of Safeway
- John C. Malone (M.A. 1964; PhD. 1967) – chairman of Liberty Media; CEO of Discovery Holding Company; largest private land owner in the United States.
- Robert D. Manning – financial expert in consumer credit, author of Credit Card Nation
- Michael Marcus – commodities trader
- Dave McClure – founder of 500 Startups
- Gail J. McGovern (B.A. 1974) – president and CEO of the American Red Cross
- Bill Miller – chairman and chief investment officer of Legg Mason Capital Management
- Gordon Moore – co-founder and chairman emeritus of Intel; author of Moore's law
- Edward L. Morse – global head of Commodities Research at Citigroup; co-founder of PFC Energy
- Samuel J. Palmisano – IBM chairman, former president and CEO
- Karen Peetz (M.S. ’81) – president of BNY Mellon
- N. Anthony Coles (B.A. 1982) – former president, CEO and chairman of Onyx Pharmaceuticals; former chairman and CEO of Cerevel Therapeutics
- Nabil M. Lawandy (B.A. 1977, M.S. 1979, Ph.D. 1980) – founder, president and CEO of Spectra Systems Corporation
- Jeff Bell (M.A. 1988) – former CEO of PPLSI; chairman of DOmedia
- Leslie Sanchez – founder and CEO of Impacto Group LLC
- Charles Scharf – CEO of Wells Fargo
- David Sifry – founder and CEO of Technorati
- Vinod Agarwal (Ph.D.) – founder of LogicVision and SemIndia
- Aris Melissaratos (B.S.) – former president and CEO of Coleman Research Corporation; former executive at Westinghouse Electric Corporation
- J.D. Kleinke (M.S.B. 1997) – co-founder of Mount Tabor; founder of the Omnimedix Institute; former executive vice chairman of Healthgrades
- Paula Boggs (B.A.) – founder of Boggs Media; former executive vice president, general counsel and secretary of Starbucks
- Matthew E. Bershadker (M.B.A.) – president and CEO of the American Society for the Prevention of Cruelty to Animals
- Bill Stromberg – CEO of T. Rowe Price and only Johns Hopkins player in the College Football Hall of Fame (inducted 2004)
- Julian Sinclair Smith (B.S. 1952) – founder of Sinclair Broadcast Group
- Ken Babby (MBA) – CEO of the Tampa Bay Rays; former chief revenue officer of The Washington Post
- Halle Tecco (M.P.H. 2020) – founder and former CEO of Rock Health; founder of Natalist
- Alex Zhavoronkov (M.S.) – founder and CEO of Insilico Medicine
- William L. Jews (B.A.) – former CEO of CareFirst BlueCross BlueShield
- Dan Teran (2010) – founder and CEO of Managed by Q; founder and managing partner of Gutter Capital
- Christopher Bouton (Ph.D.) – founder of Entagen, acquired by Thomson Reuters in 2013
- Gary Wang – founder and CEO of Tudou (simplified Chinese: 土豆网; traditional Chinese: 土豆網; pinyin: Tǔdòu Wǎng)
- Zhu Min – deputy managing director of the International Monetary Fund; former officer of the Bank of China and the People's Bank of China

=== Government, public service, and public policy ===
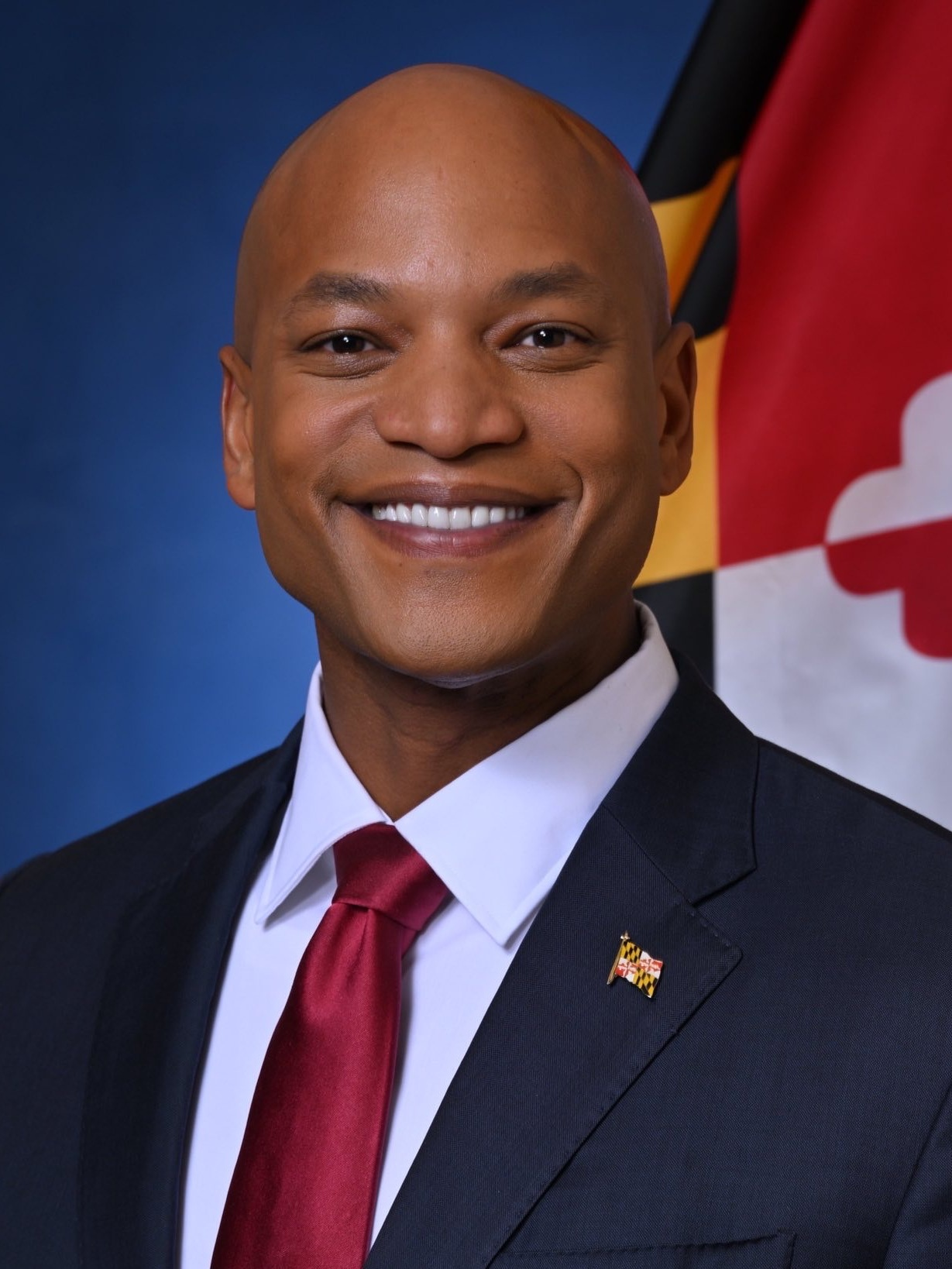
Maryland Governor Wes Moore graduated from Johns Hopkins in 2001 with a B.A. in international relations and economics.

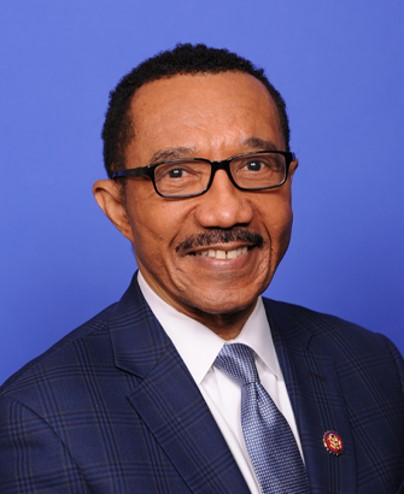
U.S. Congressmen Kweisi Mfume received an M.A. from Johns Hopkins in 1984. He has served as U.S. representative for Maryland's 7th congressional district since 2020, a position that he had previously held between 1987 and 1996.

- Mahamat Ali Adoum – foreign affairs minister, ambassador from Chad
- Spiro T. Agnew – vice president of the United States, former governor of Maryland
- Madeleine Albright – secretary of state under President Bill Clinton
- Peter F. Allgeier – deputy U.S. trade representative
- Niels Annen – member of the Bundestag, the German national parliament
- Nurul Izzah Anwar – Malaysian member of Parliament and daughter of Anwar Ibrahim
- Cresencio S. Arcos Jr. – former U.S. ambassador to Honduras and former deputy assistant secretary of State for Inter-American Affairs
- Newton D. Baker – mayor of Cleveland (1912–1915), and US secretary of war (1916–1921)
- Arthur F. Bentley – political scientist and philosopher
- Richard Bernal – former ambassador of Jamaica to the United States and former permanent representative of Jamaica to the Organization of American States
- Michael Bloomberg – founder of Bloomberg L.P., Mayor of New York City
- Paul Bomani – Tanzanian politician and ambassador
- Rudy Boschwitz – Republican senator from Minnesota (1978–1991)
- Daniel B. Brewster – Democratic senator from Maryland (1963–1969)
- Charles Hillman Brough – Democratic governor of Arkansas (1917–1921)
- R. Nicholas Burns – U.S. under secretary of state for Political Affairs, former U.S. ambassador to NATO and Greece
- Ron Capps – author, former Foreign Service Officer, and founder and director of the Veterans Writing Project
- Anne Casper – U.S. Ambassador to Burundi and former deputy chief of Mission at the U.S. Embassy in Rwanda
- Miguel Castilla – Peruvian economist and politician, former Minister of Economy and Finance, and former ambassador of Peru to the United States
- Chang Po-ya (1974) – current president of the Control Yuan, former chair of the Central Election Commission (Taiwan) (2010–2014), Minister of the Interior (Taiwan) (2000–2002), and Minister of Health (Taiwan) (1990–1997)
- Chen Chien-jen (ScD, 1982) – vice president of the Republic of China (2016–2020), former Minister of the National Science Council (2006–2008), and Minister of Health (2003–2005)
- Su Chi (S'75) – former secretary-general of the National Security Council (Taiwan) (2008–2010), legislator (2005–2008), and minister of Mainland Affairs Council (1999–2000)
- Rust Macpherson Deming – former U.S. ambassador to Tunisia, former U.S. deputy chief of Mission Japan, and recipient of the Order of the Rising Sun
- Aneesh Chopra – President Obama's chief technology officer of the United States
- Benjamin R. Civiletti – attorney general of the United States under President Jimmy Carter
- William F. Clinger, Jr. – congressman from Pennsylvania, 1979–97
- Rafael Hernández Colón – governor of Puerto Rico
- Henry A. Crumpton – ambassador-at-large, former chief of the CIA's National Resources Division, and author of The Art of Intelligence: Lessons from a Life in the CIA's Clandestine Service
- Jean de Ruyt – former ambassador of Belgium to the United Nations and the European Union; former ambassador to Italy and Albania
- Makan Delrahim – assistant attorney general for the Antitrust Division of the U.S. Department of Justice
- Anne E. Derse – U.S. ambassador to Lithuania, former ambassador to Azerbaijan
- Lawrence Di Rita – Pentagon spokesperson
- Benjamin Diokno – secretary of the Department of Finance
- Sheila Dixon – former president of Baltimore City council, mayor of Baltimore (2007–2010)
- James B. Eldridge – member of the Mass. House of Representatives (2002–present)
- Robert Stephen Ford – retired diplomat; former U.S. ambassador to Algeria and Syria
- William J. Frank – member of Maryland House of Delegates
- Frank Gaffney – founder and president of the Center for Security Policy
- Jennifer Galt – former U.S. ambassador to Mongolia
- Ibrahim Gambari – under-secretary-general of the United Nations
- Jeffrey Garten – under secretary of Commerce for International Trade; dean of the Yale School of Management
- Harold W. Geisel – former U.S. ambassador to Mauritius and former acting inspector general of the Department of State
- Timothy F. Geithner – president and CEO of the Federal Reserve Bank of New York, treasury secretary of the United States
- April Glaspie – diplomat, first woman to be appointed an American ambassador to an Arab country
- Maciej Golubiewski (born 1976) – consul general of the Republic of Poland in New York City
- Nancy Grasmick – Maryland state superintendent of Schools
- Wang Guangya – China's ambassador to the United Nations
- Geir H. Haarde – former prime minister of Iceland
- John J. Hamre – president and CEO of the Center for Strategic and International Studies, former U.S. deputy secretary of Defense
- Andy Harris – member of the United States House of Representatives, Maryland's 1st congressional district
- Moshe Hauer – executive vice president of the Orthodox Union
- John E. Herbst – former U.S. ambassador to Uzbekistan and, later, to Ukraine
- Alger Hiss – State Department official, lawyer and Soviet spy
- Hans Hoogervorst – the Netherlands' Minister of Public Health, Minister of Finance
- James Howard Holmes – former U.S. ambassador to Latvia, now State Department special adviser
- Constance Horner – official in the Reagan and first Bush administrations; formerly with the Johns Hopkins Center for the Study of American Government
- Nitobe Inazō – director of the International Bureaux Section of the League of Nations, in charge of the International Committee on Intellectual Cooperation (later became UNESCO)
- David Jacobson – former U.S. ambassador to Canada
- Tracey Ann Jacobson – former U.S. ambassador to Turkmenistan, Tajikistan, and Kosovo; acting assistant secretary of state for International Organization Affairs in 2017
- Sam Katz – politician from Philadelphia, Pennsylvania
- Mohammad Zubair Khan – former Commerce Minister of Pakistan
- Sahibzada Khan – Pakistan's high commissioner to the United Kingdom; former chief of protocol of Pakistan
- Daniel Koch – Swiss physician
- Tomi Kōra – councillor in the Japanese House of Councillors
- Frank Lavin – U.S. under secretary of Commerce for International Trade, former U.S. ambassador to Singapore
- Samuel W. Lewis – former U.S. ambassador to Israel and U.S. ambassador at the Camp David Accord talks in 1978
- Dennis P. Lockhart – president and CEO of the Federal Reserve Bank of Atlanta
- Barry Lowenkron – vice president of the Program on Global Security & Sustainability at the MacArthur Foundation
- Raymond Mabus – 75th United States secretary of the Navy
- Sir David Manning – British ambassador to Israel, foreign policy adviser to Tony Blair, British Ambassador to the United States
- Scott McCallum – 43rd governor of Wisconsin
- Gail J. McGovern – president and CEO of the American Red Cross
- David G. McIntosh Jr. (1877–1940) – Maryland state delegate and state senator
- Elizabeth Davenport McKune – former U.S. ambassador to Qatar
- John E. McLaughlin – director of Central Intelligence
- Bernard Membe – Tanzanian Minister of Foreign Affairs and International Cooperation
- Kweisi Mfume – congressman from Maryland, former president of the NAACP
- Wes Moore – Governor of Maryland
- John S. Morgan – former Maryland Delegate
- Sara Virginia Ecker Watts Morrison – former First Lady of North Carolina
- Eva Moskowitz – founder and the Chief Executive Officer of Success Charter Network and Harlem Success Academy
- Donald F. Munson – Maryland State Senator
- Cameron Munter – CEO and President of the EastWest Institute, and former U.S. Ambassador to Serbia and, later, Pakistan
- Irvin B. Nathan – Attorney General of the District of Columbia, General Counsel of the United States House of Representatives
- Ho Nieh – Chair of the Nuclear Regulatory Commission (2026–present)
- Richard Norland – former U.S. Ambassador to Georgia; nominated by President Trump to be U.S. Ambassador to Libya
- Antonia Novello – United States Surgeon General (1990–1993)
- Bruce J. Oreck – U.S. Ambassador to Finland
- John E. Osborn – Commissioner, U.S. Advisory Commission on Public Diplomacy
- Neilesh Patel – humanitarian, National Jefferson Award Recipient
- Mary Ann Peters – senior U.S. diplomat, former U.S. Ambassador to Bangladesh, former provost of the United States Naval War College, and CEO of the Carter Center
- Juan Carlos Pinzón – Ambassador of Colombia to the United States; former Colombian Minister of Defence
- Nicholas Platt – former U.S. Ambassador Extraordinary and Plenipotentiary to Pakistan, Philippines, Zambia, high level diplomat in Canada, China, Hong Kong, and Japan, and former president of the Asia Society in New York City.
- Kevin B. Quinn – Chief Executive Officer and Administrator of the Maryland Transit Administration
- George L. P. Radcliffe – U.S. Senator from Maryland (1935–1947)
- Sara Rodriguez – Lieutenant Governor of Wisconsin
- Peter Rheinstein – FDA official
- Jauhar Saleem – Ambassador of Pakistan to Germany
- Leslie Sanchez – political pundit and commentator
- Arturo Sarukhán – former ambassador of Mexico to the United States
- Christopher B. Shank – Maryland House of Delegates (1999–present)
- David B. Shear – former Assistant Secretary of Defense for Asian and Pacific Security Affairs and former U.S. Ambassador to Vietnam
- Frederic N. Smalkin – Chief United States District Judge for Maryland (2001–2003)
- Christopher Soghoian – Washington, DC based privacy researcher and activist
- George O. Squier – Chief Signal Officer of the United States Army during World War I
- Michael S. Steele – Lieutenant Governor of Maryland (2003–2007), head of the RNC (2009–2011)
- Bandar bin Sultan – Saudi Arabia's former Ambassador to the United States
- Jeffrey W. Talley – LTG. retired, 32nd Chief of Army Reserve (CAR) and 7th Commanding General, United States Army Reserve Command (USARC) 2012–2016
- Takuya Tasso – governor of Iwate Prefecture in Japan
- Lauren Underwood – U.S. Representative for Illinois's 14th congressional district
- Ali Akbar Velayati – former Minister of Foreign Affairs of Iran
- Seema Verma – Administrator of the Centers for Medicare and Medicaid Services, serving in the first Trump Administration
- Kurt Volker – U.S. Special Representative for Ukraine and former U.S. Ambassador to NATO
- Amos Griswold Warner – social worker, first head of charity for the District of Columbia
- Woodrow Wilson – President of the United States
- Xiang Lanxin – Chinese liberal intellectual and professor (MA, PhD 1990)
- Abdul Zahir – Prime Minister of Afghanistan
- Zeid Ra’ad Zeid Al-Hussein – Jordan's permanent representative to the United Nations
- Elias Zerhouni – Director of the National Institutes of Health
- Zhu Min – Deputy Managing Director of the International Monetary Fund
- Craig Zucker – member of the Maryland Senate

=== Literature, arts and media ===
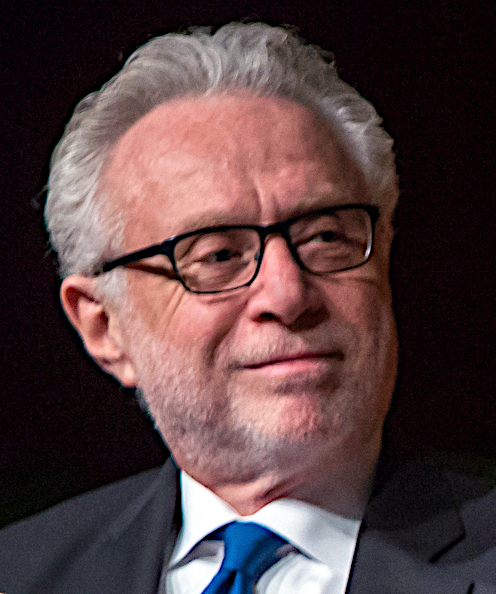
Wolf Blitzer, journalist, news anchor for CNN

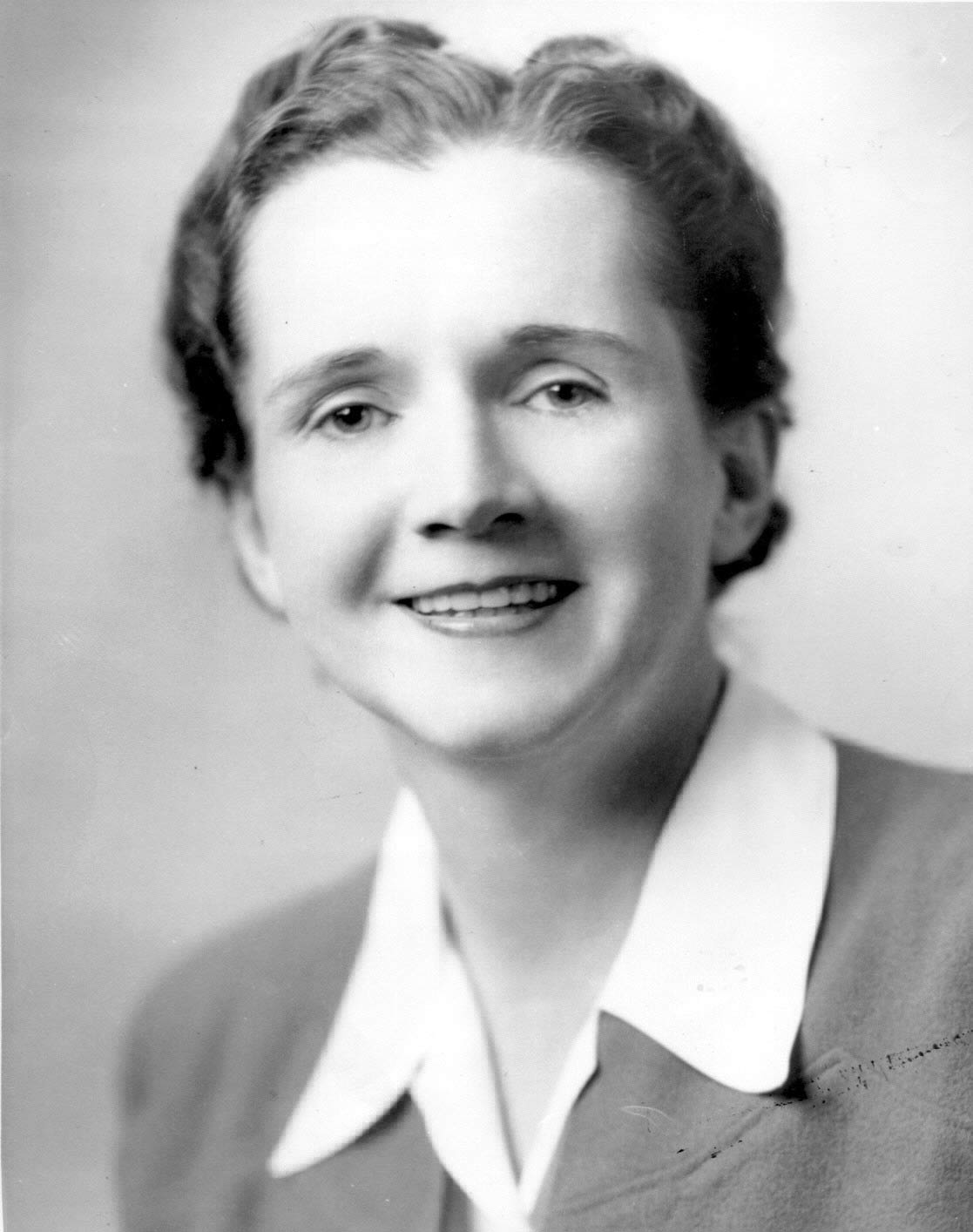
Rachel Carson, biologist and environmentalist

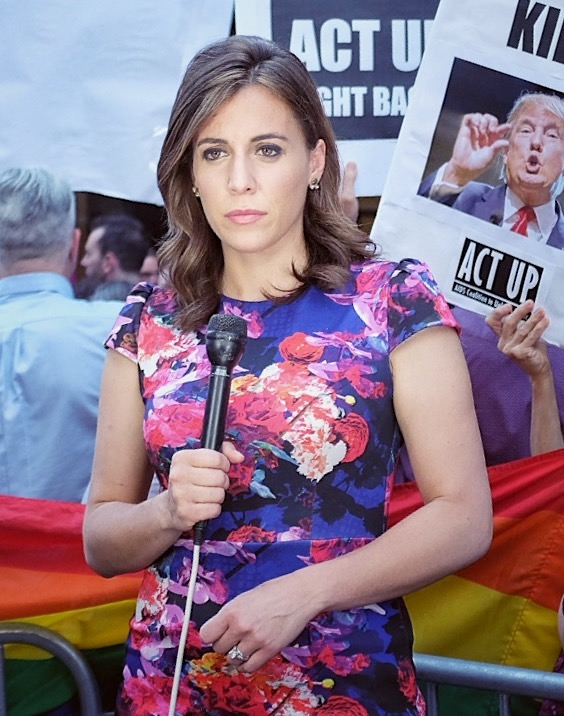
Hallie Jackson, journalist, Senior Washington correspondent for NBC News

- Arthur Talmage Abernethy – journalist, theologian, minister and first North Carolina Poet Laureate
- Keith Ablow – Fox News contributor
- Chimamanda Ngozi Adichie – author and winner of MacArthur Award
- Dan Ahdoot – standup comedian
- Jeff Altman – standup comedian
- Tori Amos – singer (Peabody Conservatory)
- Chris Arnade – former Wall Street trader turned documentarian and commentator
- John Astin – actor, Gomez Addams on The Addams Family
- Adaeze Atuegwu – author and writer
- Harriet Baber – professor of philosophy and writer for The Guardian
- Russell Baker – author, New York Times reporter and Pulitzer Prize winner
- Andy Barth – newscaster
- John Barth – novelist
- Zach Baylin – screenwriter
- Devika Bhise – actor
- Jennifer Bishop – Baltimore-based photojournalist
- Jeffrey Blitz – screenwriter
- Wolf Blitzer (M.A. 1972) – CNN news anchor
- Paul Harris Boardman – film producer and screenwriter
- Elinor Widmont Bodian – medical illustrator and abstract artist
- Denis Boyles – writer and journalist
- Matt Briggs – novelist
- Rachel Carson – marine biologist and conservationist
- Angelin Chang – Grammy Award-winning classical pianist
- Iris Chang – author and journalist
- Eva Chen – fashion magazine editor and journalist
- C. J. Cherryh – author
- Penny Colman – author
- J.D. Considine – music critic
- Richard Ben Cramer – journalist, Pulitzer Prize winner
- Wes Craven – film director and producer
- Ann Cummins – novelist and short story writer
- Richard Harding Davis – journalist who covered the Spanish–American War and World War I (attended 1885–86)
- Caleb Deschanel – cinematographer
- Thomas Dixon, Jr. – novelist
- Michael Dumanis – poet and editor
- Mildred Dunnock – film and stage actress
- Piero Formica – Italian writer and academic
- Douglas Southall Freeman – historian and winner (twice) of the Pulitzer Prize for History
- James Allen Gahres – conductor (music) (Peabody Conservatory)
- Brian David Gilbert – Journalist, comedian, actor, musician, YouTuber
- Robert Goolrick (B.A. 1970) – author
- Elin Hilderbrand – author
- Hallie Jackson (B.A. 2006) – anchor and Chief White House Correspondent for NBC News and MSNBC
- Jae Jin – singer, songwriter, musician and SAG-AFTRA actor
- Millard Kaufman – screenwriter and novelist
- Murray Kempton – Pulitzer Prize-winning journalist
- Quint Kessenich – ESPN sportscaster, lacrosse All-American
- Porochista Khakpour – novelist
- Rjyan Kidwell – musician
- Kevin Kilner – actor
- Richard E. Kim – author (MA in Writing Seminars)
- Alen Pol Kobryn – poet
- Timothy Kreider - political cartoonist and author
- Alan Lakein – author
- Sidney Lanier – musician and poet
- David Lipsky – author
- Larry Meistrich – film producer
- Sanjay Mishra – musician and guitarist
- Wes Moore – Maryland governor, author, social entrepreneur, producer and political analyst
- Megan Morrone – TechTV personality
- Walter Murch – multiple Oscar-winning sound and film editor
- Sidney Offit – author and writer
- P. J. O'Rourke – political satirist and journalist
- Niharica Raizada – actress
- Julia Randall – poet (MA in Writing Seminars)
- Arlene Raven – author and art critic; professor
- Matthew Robbins – screenwriter of The Sugarland Express and MacArthur
- Scott Rogowsky – comedian
- James Rosen – Fox News Channel Washington correspondent
- Deborah Rudacille – writer
- Brad Rutter – all-time Jeopardy! champion
- Gil Scott-Heron – political musician, poet and author (Masters Course)
- Laurence Shanet – film and theater director
- Karl Shapiro – U.S. Poet Laureate (1946), Pulitzer Prize winner (attended but did not graduate)
- Howard "Chip" Silverman – author and lacrosse coach
- Russ Smith – founder of Baltimore City Paper, Washington City Paper, and New York Press
- Gertrude Stein – author
- Lorin Stein – critic, editor and former editor in chief of The Paris Review
- Susan Stewart – poet and literary critic
- Michael Ernest Sweet – Canadian writer and photographer
- Bill Todman – game show producer
- Juliette Wells – author, editor and Jane Austen scholar
- Eleanor Wilner – poet
- Norman Wong – writer

== Notable faculty ==
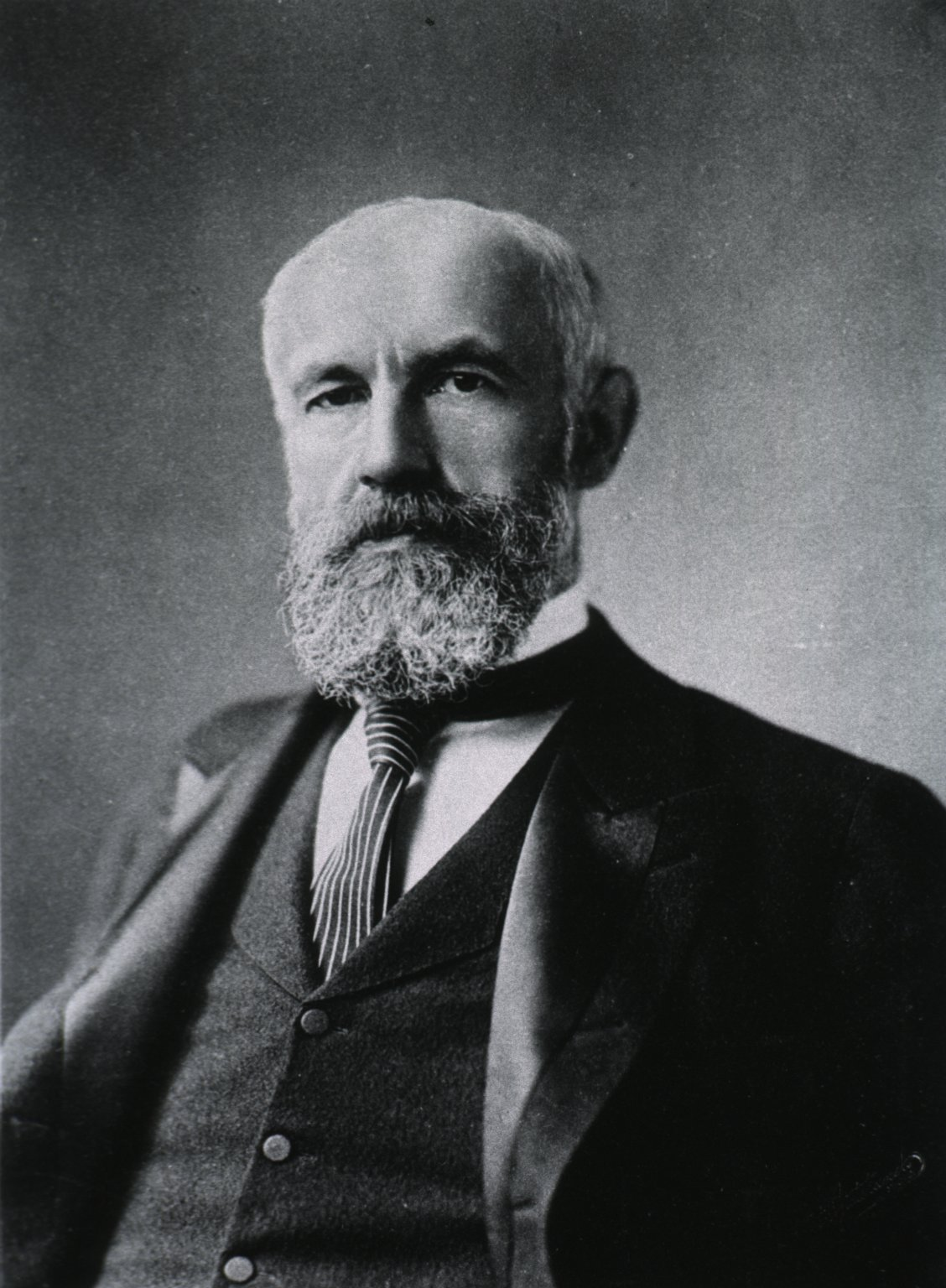
G. Stanley Hall started the first psychology lab in America at Johns Hopkins and was the first president of the American Psychological Association.

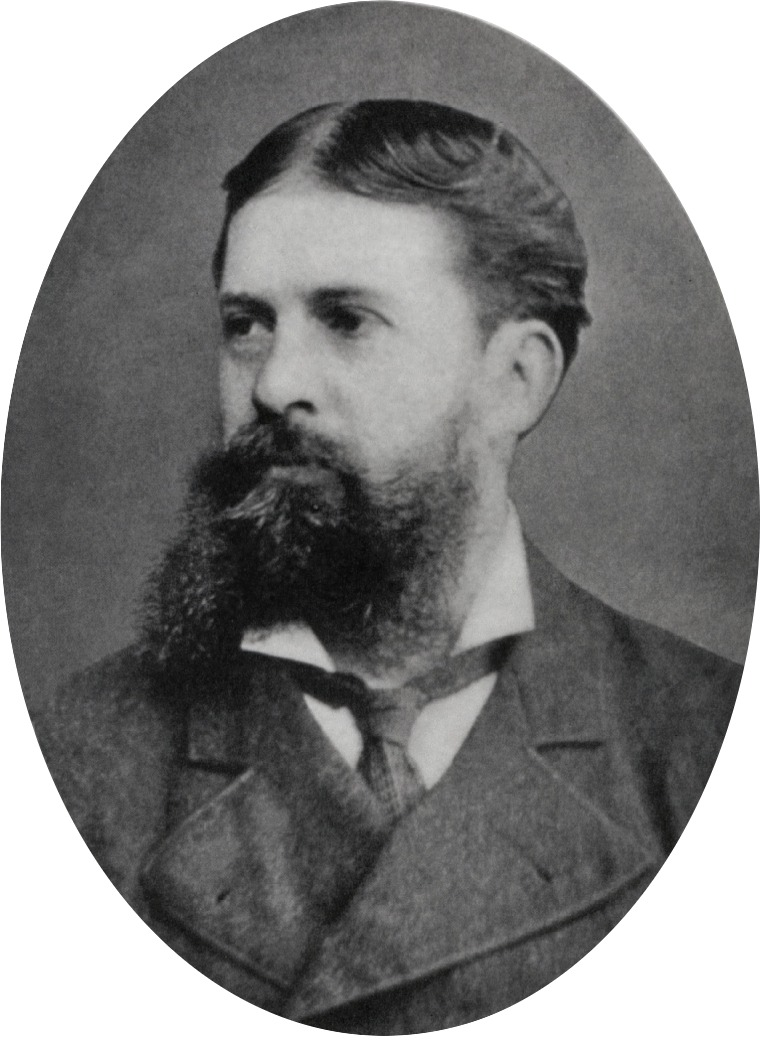
Charles Sanders Peirce, Pragmatist philosopher and mathematician, served as lecturer in logic at Johns Hopkins from 1879 to 1884

- Herbert Baxter Adams – historian, coined phrase "political science"
- Peter Agre – chemist, Nobel Prize in Chemistry, 2003
- Fouad Ajami – professor of Middle Eastern studies at SAIS and Director of the Council on Foreign Relations
- William Foxwell Albright – authenticator of the Dead Sea Scrolls, linguist, ceramics expert
- Ethan Allen Andrews – biologist
- Christian B. Anfinsen – Nobel Prize in Chemistry, 1972
- John Astin – television actor (The Addams Family), lecturer in the Johns Hopkins Writing Seminars department
- James Mark Baldwin – philosopher
- John W. Baldwin – medievalist, member of the French Academy
- Florence E. Bamberger – professor of education, director of the College for Teachers
- John Barth – novelist
- Charles L. Bennett – astrophysicist, principal investigator of the Wilkinson Microwave Anisotropy Probe (WMAP)
- Peter Bergen – CNN terrorism analyst and author of Holy War, Inc.
- Richard Bett – philosopher, former Executive Director of APA
- Karin J. Blakemore – medical geneticist
- Alfred Blalock – Lasker Prize–winning surgeon
- Carlos Blanco Aguinaga – Hispanist; founder of UCSD's literature department
- Julie Brahmer – professor and thoracic oncologist
- Robert Branner – professor of art history (1969–1971)
- Eric Brill – computer scientist
- Max Broedel – medical illustrator and founder of the first US medical illustration graduate program
- Amanda M. Brown – immunologist, professor of neurology and neuroscience
- Harold Brown – secretary of defense, 1977–1981
- Zbigniew Brzezinski – National Security Advisor, 1977–1981
- Nicholas Murray Butler – Nobel Peace Prize, 1931
- David P. Calleo – director of European Studies, author of Rethinking Europe's Future
- Benjamin Carson – former director of Pediatric Neurosurgery at Johns Hopkins Hospital, author of Gifted Hands
- Arthur Cayley – mathematician
- William G. Cochran – statistician
- J. M. Coetzee – Nobel Prize in Literature, 2003
- Eliot A. Cohen – director of Strategic Studies at SAIS, advisor to the U.S. secretary of defense
- Jared Cohon – president of Carnegie Mellon University, former Assistant and Associate Dean of Engineering at Johns Hopkins
- William E. Connolly – influential political theorist
- W. Max Corden – trade economist, developed Dutch disease model
- Robert J. Cotter – chemist and mass spectrometrist
- Richard Threlkeld Cox – physicist, Cox's theorem
- Thomas Craig – mathematician
- Tyler Cymet – physician
- Maqbool Dada – professor of operations management
- Tinglong Dai – professor of operations management and business analytics
- Veena Das – feminist anthropologist
- Steven R. David – international relations
- George Delahunty – physiologist, endocrinologist, and Lilian Welsh Professor of Biology at Goucher College
- Flavio Delbono – economist, mayor of Bologna
- Samuel Denmeade – professor of Oncology, Urology and Pharmacology and Molecular Sciences at the School of Medicine
- Jacques Derrida – philosopher
- Daniel Deudney – international relations
- Stephen Dixon – prolific short story writer
- David A. Dodge – former Governor, Bank of Canada; co-chairman, the Global Market Monitoring Group of Institute of International Finance; chairman, C.D. Howe Institute; chairman, Canadian Institute for Advanced Research; former associate professor of Canadian Studies and International Economics at the School of Advanced International Studies at Johns Hopkins University
- Thomas Dolby – musician, film score composer, and music technology entrepreneur
- Vincent du Vigneaud – Nobel Prize in Chemistry, 1955
- Acheson J. Duncan – statistician, winner of the Shewhart Medal
- Ward Edwards – psychologist, prominent for work on decision theory and on the formulation and revision of beliefs.
- Jessica Einhorn – former dean of SAIS, managing director of the World Bank
- Paul H. Emmett – chemical engineer, Manhattan Project
- George L. Engel – psychiatrist, best known for the formulation of the biopsychosocial model
- Joseph Erlanger – Nobel Prize in Medicine, 1944
- Andrew Ewald – cell biologist known for work in metastatic breast cancer research
- Andrew Fire – Nobel Prize in Medicine, 2006
- Henry Jones Ford – political scientist and journalist
- Robert Stephen Ford – retired diplomat; former U.S. Ambassador to Algeria and Syria
- P. M. Forni – literary scholar and co-founder of the Johns Hopkins Civility Project
- James Franck – Nobel Prize in Physics, 1925
- John K. Frost – cytopathologist, founder and director of the Division of Cytopathology at Hopkins
- Francis Fukuyama – political economist, author The End of History
- Donald Geman – statistician
- Ashraf Ghani – former president of Afghanistan
- Riccardo Giacconi – Nobel Prize in Physics, 2002; National Medal of Science, 2003
- René Girard – French-American philosopher and literary critic; professor at Johns Hopkins 1968–1976; developer of mimetic theory and the scapegoat mechanism; organizer of the 1966 structuralism conference that introduced French theory to American academia
- Basil Lanneau Gildersleeve – classical scholar
- Benjamin Ginsberg – Libertarian political scientist and professor
- Maria Goeppert-Mayer – Nobel Prize in Physics, 1963
- Michael Griffin – former NASA administrator (2005–2009)
- Stanislav Grof – psychologist
- Deborah Gross – professor of nursing at Johns Hopkins School of Nursing
- G. Stanley Hall – pioneer in the field of psychology; founding president of Clark University
- William Stewart Halsted – founding head of the Department of Surgery
- Steve H. Hanke – economist, United States Presidential advisor, Cato Institute senior fellow
- Haldan Keffer Hartline – Nobel Prize in Medicine, 1967
- David Harvey (until 2001) – geographer
- Robert Heptinstall – renal pathologist, chair of the Hopkins pathology department
- Robert Herman – astronomer and physicist
- Christian A. Herter, Jr. – former U.S. secretary of state and governor of Massachusetts
- John L. Holland – psychologist who developed the RIASEC career model
- Hans-Hermann Hoppe – economist
- Roger Horn – co-developed the Bateman-Horn conjecture and wrote the standard-issue Matrix Analysis textbook with Charles Royal Johnson
- Ralph H. Hruban – pathologist
- David H. Hubel – Nobel Prize in Medicine, 1971
- Kathy Hudson – microbiologist specializing in science policy, founder of the Genetics and Public Policy Center at Johns Hopkins University
- Rufus Isaacs – game theorist, winner of Frederick W. Lanchester Prize
- Nathan Jacobson – mathematician
- Kay Redfield Jamison – professor of Psychiatry
- Frederick Jelinek – pioneer in automatic speech recognition and natural language processing
- Ellis L. Johnson – professor emeritus and the Coca-Cola Chaired Professor in the H. Milton Stewart School of Industrial and Systems Engineering at Georgia Institute of Technology
- Kenneth H. Keller – president of the University of Minnesota system
- Howard Atwood Kelly – founding head of the Department of Gynecology
- Hugh Kenner – Andrew Mellon professor of humanities 1973–1990, literary critic, expert on Ezra Pound and James Joyce, and popular writer on computing
- Majid Khadduri – professor of Islamic Law and Middle East specialist
- Kunihiko Kodaira – mathematician, Fields Medal winner
- Anne O. Krueger – managing director of the IMF and World Bank Chief Economist
- Simon Kuznets – Nobel Prize in Economics, 1971
- Barbara Landau – cognitive scientist, leading authority on Williams syndrome
- Maria Teresa Landi – epidemiologist and oncologist
- Sidney Lanier
- Albert L. Lehninger – author of a long-time standard biochemistry textbook
- Robert C. Lieberman – political scientist
- Paul Linebarger – author known as Cordwainer Smith
- Marisa Lino – former U.S. Ambassador to Albania and former director of the Bologna Center of the Paul H. Nitze School of Advanced International Studies
- Alfred J. Lotka – mathematician and statistician
- Arthur Oncken Lovejoy – philosopher, founder of the Journal of the History of Ideas
- Marty Makary – physician
- Nina Marković – physicist and professor
- Elmer McCollum – professor and biochemist, co-discovered vitamins A, B, and D
- Alice McDermott – novelist, National Book Award, 1998
- Victor A. McKusick – medical geneticist, author of Mendelian Inheritance in Man
- John McLaughlin- former Deputy Director and Acting Director of the Central Intelligence Agency.
- Andrew Mertha – political scientist
- Merton H. Miller – Nobel Prize in Economics, 1990
- George Richards Minot – Nobel Prize in Medicine, 1934
- Jack Morava – mathematician
- Frank Morley – mathematician
- Harmon Northrop Morse – chemist, Avogadro Medal 1916
- Robert H. Mundell – Nobel Prize in Economics, 1999
- Azar Nafisi – Muslim feminist and author
- Daniel Nathans – Nobel Prize in Medicine, 1978
- Simon Newcomb – astronomer and mathematician
- John Niparko – surgeon and scientist specializing in cochlear implants
- Paul H. Nitze – diplomat, principal author NSC 68, co-founder of SAIS
- Santa J. Ono – 15th president and vice-chancellor, University of British Columbia; 28th president, University of Cincinnati; immunologist
- Lars Onsager – Nobel Prize in Chemistry, 1968
- Sir William Osler – founding head of the Department of Medicine
- Sidney Painter – medievalist
- Edwards A. Park – chief of Pediatrics in the Harriet Lane Home, proved the cause of rickets
- Robert G. Parr – theoretical chemist
- Henry Paulson – former U.S. treasury secretary (2006–2009)
- Ronald Paulson – English specialist
- Charles Sanders Peirce – logician
- Phillip Phan – Alonzo and Virginia Decker Professor of Strategy and Entrepreneurship
- J.G.A. Pocock – Harry C. Black Professor of History Emeritus
- John Pollini – art historian
- Matthew Porterfield – film director and professor of film
- Ayn Rand – author of The Fountainhead and Atlas Shrugged; visiting lecturer in 1961
- Mark M. Ravitch – surgeon
- Stuart C. Ray – physician
- Ira Remsen – chemist, discoverer of saccharin
- Francisco Rico Manrique – visiting professor of Spanish, 1966–1967
- Riordan Roett – political scientist and Latin America specialist
- Richard S. Ross – cardiologist; former dean of Johns Hopkins School of Medicine
- Henry Augustus Rowland – physicist
- Avi Rubin – head of the ACCURATE organization, established to solve the problem of secure electronic voting
- Pedro Salinas – Spanish poet, Turnbull Professor
- Mavis Sanders – faculty and researcher at Center for Research on the Education of Students Placed at Risk, director of Urban Education program, assistant director of the National Network of Partnership Schools
- Karl Shapiro – professor of poetry, former U.S. Poet Laureate
- Vyacheslav Shokurov – mathematician
- Charles S. Singleton – scholar of medieval Italian literature
- Robert Skidelsky – economist, biographer of John Maynard Keynes
- Henry Slonimsky – philosopher
- Hamilton O. Smith – Nobel Prize in Medicine, 1978
- R. Jeffrey Smith – Pulitzer Prize winner
- Paul Smolensky – cognitive scientist; authored Optimality Theory
- Solomon H. Snyder – National Medal of Science, 2003
- Gabrielle M. Spiegel – historian of the Middle Ages; former president of the American Historical Association
- Leo Spitzer – romance philologist, literary scholar
- Julian Stanley – professor of Psychology; founder of the Study of Mathematically Precocious Youth
- Sir Richard Stone – Nobel Prize in Economics, 1984
- Mark Strand – 1990–1991 US Poet Laureate, Pulitzer Prize winner
- Raman Sundrum – physicist
- Kathleen M. Sutcliffe – Bloomberg Distinguished Professor of Business and Medicine
- James Joseph Sylvester – mathematician
- Shirin R. Tahir-Kheli – political scientist; first U.S. Ambassador for Women's Empowerment; former Senior Advisor to the Secretary of State on United Nations Reform; former Senior Director for Democracy, Human Rights and International Operations at the White House National Security Council
- Caroline Bedell Thomas – cardiologist, Johns Hopkins School of Medicine third female full professor
- Vivien Thomas – co-developer of the Blalock-Thomas-Taussig shunt, along with Alfred Blalock and Helen Taussig
- Clifford Truesdell – mathematician, natural philosopher, historian of mathematics
- Harold Clayton Urey – Nobel Prize in Chemistry, 1934
- Henry N. Wagner – pioneer in nuclear medicine
- Kameshwar C. Wali – physicist, member of Johns Hopkins Society of Scholars from 1980
- John Walker – concert organist (Peabody Conservatory)
- David B. Weishampel – paleontologist, author of The Dinosauria 2004
- William H. Welch – founding head of the Department of Pathology
- James West – National Medal of Technology, 2006
- George Hoyt Whipple – Nobel Prize in Medicine, 1934
- Chester Wickwire – chaplain emeritus and humanist
- Torsten Wiesel – Nobel Prize in Medicine, 1981
- Michael Williams – philosopher
- Denis Wirtz – Vice Provost for Research and Theophilus Halley Smoot Professor of Engineering Science
- Paul Wolfowitz – President, World Bank, former United States Deputy Secretary of Defense, former Dean of SAIS
- Barry Wood – microbiologist and physician
- Robert W. Wood – experimental physicist
- Oscar Zariski – Russian-born American mathematician
- Elias Zerhouni – director of the National Institutes of Health

== Fictional alumni ==
- Dr. Ellie Bartlet – daughter of President Josiah Bartlet in the television series The West Wing
- Dr. Preston Burke – cardiothoracic surgeon on the television series Grey's Anatomy
- Dr. Perry Cox – main character of the television series Scrubs
- Dr. Seth Griffin –- resident played by Bruce Greenwood on the show St. Elsewhere
- Dr. Zoe Hart – big city surgical resident turned rural Alabama general practitioner played by Rachel Bilson in Hart of Dixie
- Dr. James Harvey – paranormal therapist portrayed by Bill Pullman in Casper
- Dr. Julius Hibbert – family doctor on The Simpsons
- Dr. Gregory House – main character of the television series House
- Dr. Tom Koracick – neurosurgeon on the television series Grey's Anatomy
- Dr. Hannibal Lecter – psychiatrist and cannibalistic serial killer in The Silence of the Lambs, based on the novel by Thomas Harris
- Dr. Steven Newsome – doctor played by Edward Herrmann in M*A*S*H episode "Heal Thyself" (Season 8, Episode 17)
- Lena – professor and biologist portrayed by Natalie Portman in Annihilation, based on the novel by Jeff VanderMeer
- Dr. John Prentice – doctor played by Sidney Poitier in Guess Who's Coming to Dinner
- Dr. Arizona Robbins – pediatric surgeon on the television series Grey's Anatomy
- Dr. Amelia Shepherd – neurosurgeon on television series Grey's Anatomy
