= Maddrey =

Maddrey is a surname. Notable people with the surname include:

- Jeffrey Maddrey (born 1971), American police officer;
- Joseph Maddrey (born 1979), American author and screenwriter;
- Willis Maddrey (fl. 1960–1993), American physician and internist.
