= Dan Teran =

American businessman

- Education: Johns Hopkins University
- Occupations: Businessman and venture capitalist
- Known for: Managed by Q

Dan Teran is an American businessman and venture capitalist. He is the founder and CEO of Managed by Q, a New York City-based office management platform. He is also the founder and managing partner of Gutter Capital.

Teran was recognized in the Forbes list for Forbes 30 Under 30 list in Enterprise Technology in 2016 and 30 Under 30 All-Star Alumni in 2017. He was also recognized in the Crain's New York Business 40 Under 40 list for his business.

== Education ==
Teran has a degree in International Studies from Johns Hopkins University.

== Work ==
Teran started his career as a content writer with Artsicle, an online business for arts and artists.

He co-founded Managed by Q in 2013. His company provided office management services including cleaning, IT support and catering. It had more than 1000 offices in the United States and raised a total of $128 million by 2019. In 2019, Managed by Q was acquired by WeWork and Teran joined the WeWork leadership team.

Teran has also worked as a policy advocate for the Citizens Planning & Housing Association, and founded the Sustainable Hopkins Infrastructure Program. He managed a campaign for Maryland State Delegate Keith Haynes, served as a paralegal with Weitz & Luxenberg, and has trained under the guidance of activist Erin Brockovich. He has also served as adviser and investor to ESL Works, a messaging app to teach English to food service workers.

Teran was featured in the 2018 book Gigged: The End of the Job and the Future of Work by Sarah Kessler for his role as a tech entrepreneur.
