= Maria Teresa Landi =

Italian epidemiologist and oncologist

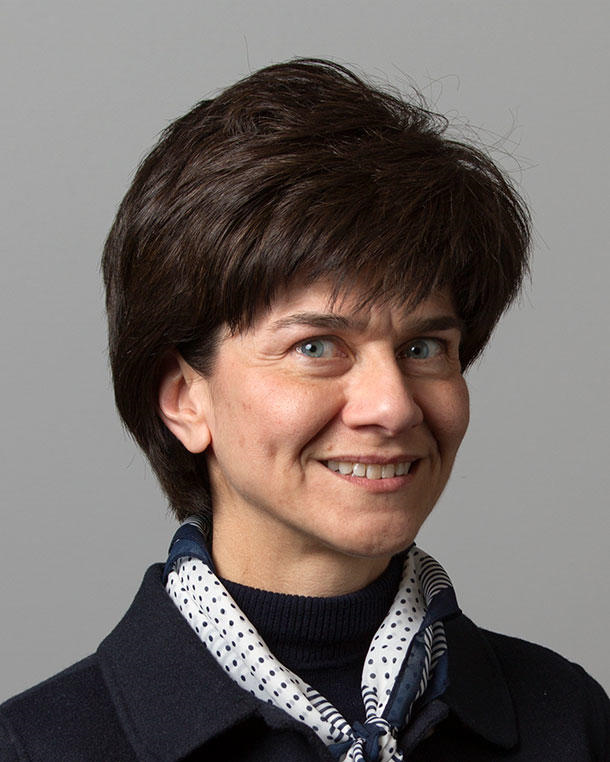
- Education: University of Milan; Italian University Consortium
- Scientific career
- Fields: Cancer epidemiology, genomics, environmental health
- Workplaces: National Cancer Institute; Johns Hopkins Bloomberg School of Public Health

Maria Teresa Landi is an Italian epidemiologist and oncologist who researches genetic and environmental determinants of lung cancer and melanoma. At the National Cancer Institute, she is a senior investigator in the integrative tumor epidemiology branch and a senior advisor for genomic epidemiology. Landi is an associate professor of epidemiology at the Johns Hopkins Bloomberg School of Public Health.

== Life ==
Landi completed an M.D. summa cum laude from the University of Milan and was trained in oncology and general medicine at the San Raffaele Hospital. She earned a Ph.D. in occupational medicine and industrial hygiene, a subgroup of molecular epidemiology, from an Italian University Consortium in 1993. Landi qualified for the associate professorship in occupational medicine and industrial hygiene in the Italian Universities in 1998.

Landi received tenure in the National Cancer Institute's division of cancer epidemiology and genetics (DCEG) in 2006. She is a senior investigator in the integrative tumor epidemiology branch. She is an associate professor of epidemiology at the Johns Hopkins Bloomberg School of Public Health. Landi and her team conduct germline and somatic genomic analyses in population studies. In 2021, she was appointed senior advisor for genomic epidemiology in DCEG's trans-divisional research program. Landi's research focuses on understanding tumor etiology and evolution for potential translational applications. She leads large-scale multidisciplinary research projects primarily on genetic and environmental determinants of lung cancer and melanoma. Landi conducts analyses of genomic, transcriptomic, and epigenomic data, and integrates molecular data with histological and radiological imaging and clinical and epidemiological data. She also examines the role of dioxins in cancer risk among highly exposed populations, utilizing markers of exposure and early effect.

== See also ==
- Women in medicine
- List of Italian scientists
- List of Johns Hopkins University people
