= Chi-Chao Chan =

American ophthalmologist

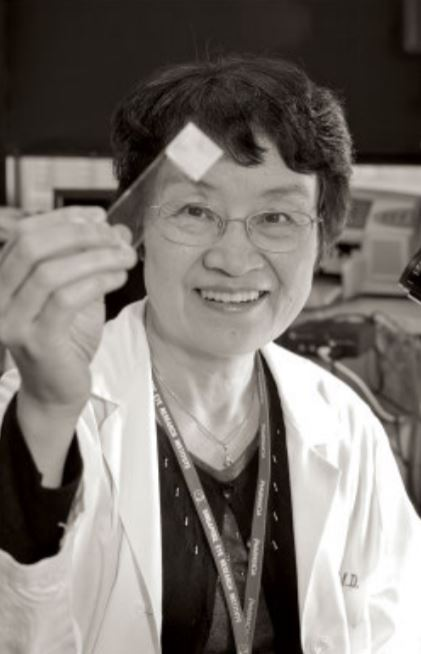
- Education: Chung Shan Medical College; Johns Hopkins University
- Scientific career
- Fields: Ophthalmic pathology
- Workplaces: National Eye Institute

Chi-Chao Chan is a Chinese-born American ophthalmologist and physician-scientist specialized in the diagnosis and pathology of eye diseases. She joined the National Eye Institute (NEI) as a postdoctoral researcher in 1982 and remained until her retirement in 2015. Chan was promoted in 1999 to senior investigator and chief of the NEI immunopathology section and the histopathology core.

== Education ==
Chan completed a M.D. at Chung Shan Medical College (Sun Yat-sen University of Medical Sciences) in 1967 just as the Cultural Revolution was commencing. She came to the U.S. via Hong Kong in 1968. Chan learned English at Boston University and took undergraduate courses at Kent State University and Johns Hopkins University. She earned a B.A. (1972) and a second M.D. (1975) at Johns Hopkins.

Chan completed a residency in ophthalmology at Stanford University Medical Center from 1976 to 1979. She did a postdoctoral fellowship in ophthalmic pathology under W. Richard Green at the Wilmer Ophthalmological Institute from 1979 to 1982. Chan joined the National Eye Institute (NEI) from 1982 to 1986 for a second postdoctoral fellowship in clinical ocular immunology/uveitis in the laboratory of Robert B. Nussenblatt.

== Career ==
Following her postdoctoral fellowship at the NEI, Chan continued working there as a medical officer. She was promoted in 1992 to chief of the immunopathology section. Chan became chief of the NEI histopathology core in 1999. Her laboratory had a strong relationship with the National Institutes of Health Clinical Center. The core, which had a Clinical Laboratory Improvement Approved (CLIA) certification, received both clinical and experimental specimens, and processes 6000-8000 samples annually. Chan was a mentor to NEI clinical and research post-doctoral and post-baccalaureate fellows. She has helped in the development and improvement of ophthalmology and vision research in China and, in this process, has promoted exchange among ophthalmologists and vision researchers within China, the United States, and the world.

Chan coauthored over 600 publications. Chan's research led to new ways of diagnosing primary vitreoretinal lymphoma (PVRL). Her team discovered that certain changes at the protein and molecular level could be used to help diagnose PVRL earlier, enabling patients to start chemotherapy sooner. She also researched the pathology of uveitis and Von Hippel–Lindau disease and the genetics and pathogenesis of age-related macular degeneration.

Chan received recognitions including the 2010 outstanding achievement award in ophthalmology and visual science for overseas Chinese from the Chinese Ophthalmological Society, a gold fellow appointment from the Association for Research in Vision and Ophthalmology in 2011, and the 2013 senior achievement award of the American Academy of Ophthalmology.

Chan retired in 2015 after 33 years at the NEI. She continued as a scientist emeritus.

== Personal life ==
Upon retirement, Chan relocated to San Francisco to live near her son and grandchildren.
