= David W. Kennedy (academician) =

American academician, surgeon and otolaryngologist

David William Kennedy is an American academician, surgeon, and otolaryngologist. He is currently serving as an emeritus professor at the University of Pennsylvania.

Kennedy pioneered endoscopic sinus surgery, a method which he named functional endoscopic surgery (FESS) and which became the standard surgical treatment for chronic rhinosinusitis.

Kennedy was recognized by the American College of Surgeons as one of the most influential surgeons of the 20th Century. He developed the first rhinology fellowship thereby introducing the subspecialty of rhinology.

== Early life and education ==
Kennedy received his education at Ampleforth College in York, England, completing his university entrance exams in 1966. He earned his M.D. from the Royal College of Surgeons in 1972 with numerous awards and medals. His post-graduate training included periods at St. Laurence's Hospital in Dublin, Ireland, along with various residencies in surgery and otolaryngology at Johns Hopkins University in Baltimore, MD.

After completing his residency in 1978, Kennedy joined the faculty of Johns Hopkins University. Having been exposed to Donald F. Proctor's teachings on nasal physiology and mucociliary clearance, he was influenced by the work of Prof. Walter Messerklinger in Austria, as a means to reduce the surgical morbidity and improve the results of sinus surgery. This involved a change in focus for disease management and the use of endoscopes and improved radiographic imaging for the diagnosis and management of sinus disease. He conducted proof of concept research involving rabbit experiments. This research led to the publication of initial articles on the theoretical foundations of functional endoscopic techniques and endoscopic sinus surgery.

Kennedy received his board certification in otolaryngology in 1978 and became a fellow of the Royal College of Surgeons in Ireland in 1979.

== Career ==
Kennedy joined the University of Pennsylvania as Departmental Chair in 1991. In various roles at Penn Medicine, he served as vice dean for Professional Services at the Perelman School of Medicine, and was senior vice president of UPHS. He was involved in leading the Clinical Practices of the University of Pennsylvania and developing the Patient Facilitated Services Program. In his Vice Dean role, he introduced an organizational methodology for funds flow in academic medicine. He currently holds the title of emeritus professor.

During his career, Kennedy has served as president of the American Rhinologic Society, the International Symposium of Infection and Allergy of the Nose, the International Rhinologic Society and the American Academy of Otolaryngology–Head and Neck Surgery. Previously, he was the inaugural editor-in-chief of the International Forum of Allergy and Rhinology and American Journal of Rhinology.

In 2002, the David W. Kennedy, MD Professorship was established by his patients at Penn Medicine in recognition of his contributions to rhinology and his role in clinical practice at Penn Medicine. David W. Kennedy, MD, Annual Lecture is also named after him.

== Research ==
Kennedy's research has focused on the pathogenesis of rhinosinusitis, mucociliary clearance, olfaction, and the management of nasal and sinus disease. He developed surgical instruments and improved techniques for endoscopic sinus surgery and minimally invasive skull base surgery. Kennedy worked closely with James Zinreich, a radiologist at Hopkins to improve sinus radiographic imaging, developing appropriate CT and MR imaging to identify sinus disease, as well as to develop techniques for computer assisted surgery.

His clinical expertise includes endoscopic sinus surgery, minimally invasive skull base surgery, CSF leak closure, endoscopic orbital surgery, and endoscopic pituitary surgery.

== Bibliography ==
=== Books ===
- Kennedy DW, Olsen, M: Living With Chronic Sinusitis: The Complete Health Guide to Preventing and Treating Colds, Nasal Allergies, Rhinitis and Sinusitis (Healthy Living Books/Hatherleigh Press, 2004).
- Kennedy DW, Bolger WE, Zinreich SJ: Diseases of the Sinuses: Diagnosis and Management, BC Decker, 2001
- Thaler E, Kennedy DW: Rhinosinusitis: A Guide to the Diagnosis and Management, Springer, 2008
- Kennedy DW, Hwang PH: Rhinology: Diseases of the Nose, Sinuses and Skull Base, Thieme, 2012
- Kennedy DW, Myers EM: Rhinology. Walters Kluwer, 2016

== Selected publications ==
- Kennedy, D. W.; Zinreich, S. J.; Rosenbaum, A. E.; Johns, M. E. (September 26, 1985). "Functional endoscopic sinus surgery. Theory and diagnostic evaluation". Archives of Otolaryngology. 111 (9): 576–582. doi:10.1001/archotol.1985.00800110054002. PMID 4026673.
- Kennedy, D. W. (October 26, 1985). "Functional endoscopic sinus surgery. Technique". Archives of Otolaryngology. 111 (10): 643–649. doi:10.1001/archotol.1985.00800120037003. PMID 4038136.
- Zinreich, S. J.; Kennedy, D. W.; Rosenbaum, A. E.; Gayler, B. W.; Kumar, A. J.; Stammberger, H. (June 26, 1987). "Paranasal sinuses: CT imaging requirements for endoscopic surgery". Radiology. 163 (3): 769–775. doi:10.1148/radiology.163.3.3575731. PMID 3575731.
- Kennedy, D. W.; Goodstein, M. L.; Miller, N. R.; Zinreich, S. J. (March 26, 1990). "Endoscopic transnasal orbital decompression". Archives of Otolaryngology–Head & Neck Surgery. 116 (3): 275–282. doi:10.1001/archotol.1990.01870030039006. PMID 2306344.
- Lanza, D. C.; Kennedy, D. W. (September 26, 1997). "Adult rhinosinusitis defined". Otolaryngology–Head and Neck Surgery. 117 (3 Pt 2): S1–7. doi:10.1016/S0194-59989770001-9. PMID 9334782.
- Lund, V. J.; Kennedy, D. W. (September 26, 1997). "Staging for rhinosinusitis". Otolaryngology–Head and Neck Surgery. 117 (3 Pt 2): S35–40. doi:10.1016/S0194-59989770005-6. PMID 9334786.
- Kennedy, David W.; Josephson, Jordan S.; Mattox, Douglas E.; Goldsmith, Manning M.; Zinreich, S. James (September 1989). "Endoscopic sinus surgery for mucoceles: A viable alternative". The Laryngoscope. 99 (9): 885–895. doi:10.1288/00005537-198909000-00002. PMID 2770380.
- Lund, Valerie J.; Kennedy, David W. (October 1995). "Quantification for Staging Sinusitis". Annals of Otology, Rhinology & Laryngology. 104 (10_suppl): 17–21. doi:10.1177/000348949510410s02. PMID 7574265.
- Mattox, Douglas E.; Kennedy, David W. (August 1990). "Endoscopic management of cerebrospinal fluid leaks and cephaloceles". The Laryngoscope. 100 (8): 857–862. doi:10.1288/00005537-199008000-00012. PMID 2381261.

== Awards and recognition ==
- Sir William Wilde Medal
- National Physician of the Year for Clinical Excellence from Castle Connolly
- National Academy of Medicine
- 100 most influential surgeons of the 20th century by the American College of Surgeons
- Award of Merit, European Rhinologic Society
- Honorary Doctorate, University of Medicine "Carol Davila" Bucharest, Romania
- Lifetime Achievement Award from the American Rhinologic Society
- The International Federation of Otolaryngologic Societies (IFOS) Gold Medal Award
