= Nita Patel =

Indian-American physician and vaccinologist

- Born: 1965 (age 60–61); Sojitra
- Education: Johns Hopkins University; Sardar Patel University
- Scientific career
- Workplaces: Novavax; AstraZeneca

Nita K. Patel (born 1965) is an Indian-American vaccinologist who leads vaccine development at Novavax. She oversaw the development of the Novavax COVID-19 vaccine.

== Early life and education ==
Patel was born in Sojitra, a farming village in Gujarat. When she was four years old her father contracted tuberculosis, and came close to death. This experience motivated Patel to become a physician and attempt to find a cure for tuberculosis. She went on to earn a master's degree in microbiology at Sardar Patel University and a master's degree in biotechnology at Johns Hopkins University.

== Research and career ==
After graduating from Johns Hopkins, Patel moved to Gaithersburg, Maryland where she worked for MedImmune, a company that looked to create vaccinations for tuberculosis, respiratory syncytial virus and Lyme disease. She was the sixteenth member of the MedImmune team. Later the company eventually acquired by AstraZeneca.

In 2015, Patel left AstraZeneca to join Novavax, a biotechnology start-up in Maryland. Her research considers antibody discovery and vaccine development. She oversaw the development of the Novavax COVID-19 vaccine, and led an all-woman team. After Patel received the SARS-CoV-2 spike protein in February 2020, she designed and characterized over twenty variants of the protein. This involved identifying the locations where antibodies bind to the protein, and developing tests to check whether the spike is consistent between manufacturing plant. The vaccines developed by Patel and Novavax make use of recombinant DNA. In an interview with Science Magazine, Patel said that she had worked eighteen hour days to develop the vaccine, but didn't get tired. They were awarded a $1.6 billion contract to run clinical trials. In 2021, the vaccine was shown to be 89% effective in large trials in the United Kingdom.

== Selected publications ==
- Cheryl Keech; Gary Albert; Iksung Cho; et al. (2 September 2020). "Phase 1-2 Trial of a SARS-CoV-2 Recombinant Spike Protein Nanoparticle Vaccine". The New England Journal of Medicine. doi:10.1056/nejmoa2026920. ISSN 0028-4793. PMID 32877576. Wikidata Q98902656.
- Bryce D Smith; Rebecca L Morgan; Geoff A Beckett; et al. (1 August 2012). "Recommendations for the identification of chronic hepatitis C virus infection among persons born during 1945-1965". Morbidity and Mortality Weekly Report: Recommendations and Reports. 61 (RR-4): 1–32. ISSN 1057-5987. PMID 22895429. Wikidata Q34294185.
- William F Dall'Acqua; Robert M Woods; E. Sally Ward; et al. (1 November 2002). "Increasing the affinity of a human IgG1 for the neonatal Fc receptor: biological consequences". Journal of Immunology. 169 (9): 5171–5180. doi:10.4049/jimmunol.169.9.5171. ISSN 0022-1767. PMID 12391234. Wikidata Q33184928.

== Personal life ==
Patel is married to an American biochemist.
