= Orra Almira Phelps =

American doctor, teacher, naturalist, botanist, and environmentalist (1895-1986)

Orra Almira Phelps (10 September 1895-26 August 1986) was an American physician, botanist, naturalist, mountaineer, and writer. Phelps was born in Storrs, Connecticut. Her mother was a noted botanist in her own right and mentored Orra. Her father struggled with employment. As a result, the family moved frequently and Orra helped take care of her six siblings. She graduated from Mount Holyoke College in 1918 after studying zoology and geology and later graduated with a medical degree from Johns Hopkins University in 1927. Phelps served as a navy physician during World War Two, and later taught botany and biology in Saratoga Springs. In 1934, Phelps published the first trail guide to the High Peaks Region. It was noted for its accuracy and thoroughness; she hiked each of the trails herself to ensure it was complete. She became an Adirondack Forty-Sixer in 1947, one of only forty-seven people at the time. Phelps had extensive knowledge of the plants and animals of the area, and as the first ranger-naturalist for the Adirondack Mountain Club (ADK) she organized a nature museum in a tent and her car, and educated guests and visitors about the wildlife.

An 18-acre parcel of land in Saratoga where Phelps used to go birding, specimen hunting, and walking was donated by her niece to become the Orra Phelps Preserve.

== Bibliography ==
- Arakelian, Mary (2001). Doc : Orra A. Phelps, M.D., Adirondack Naturalist and Mountaineer. North Country Books Inc. p. 326. ISBN 978-0925168665.
