= Sundyne =

American manufacturing company

- Type: Subsidiary
- Industry: Manufacturing
- Headquarters: Arvada, Colorado, USA
- Parent: Honeywell
- Website: sundyne.com

Sundyne, LLC is an American company that designs, manufactures, and supports industrial pump and compressor products for the process fluid and gas industries. In June 2025, Honeywell announced that it had completed its purchase of the company for $2.16 billion.

== Pump and compressor technology ==
Sundyne centrifugal pumps and compressors are traditionally utilized for processes requiring high-head (pumps: 6,300 ft or 1,921 m)(compressors: 4000 psi or 350 bara), and low-flow (pumps: 1,100 GPM or 250 m3/hr)(compressors: 10000 acfm or 1700 0am3/hr).

Sundyne Sunflo pumps utilize high-speed technology to generate high pressure typically for boiler feed, reverse osmosis, NOx suppression, washdown (food and beverage production), injection, seal flush, and condensate return.

=== Pump and compressor types and standards manufactured by Sundyne ===
Sundyne engineered pump and compressor models are compliant with the International Organization for Standardization ISO 13709, and American Petroleum Institute API-610, API-617, API-614, API-685, and ASME/ANSI standards.

== Legacy brands ==
- Sundyne ISO/API Centrifugal Intregrally Geared Process Pumps and Compressors
- Sunflo Industrial Grade Integrally Geared Centrifugal Pumps
- Ansimag Sealless Magnetic Drive Plastic Lined Pumps
- HMD Sealless Magnetic Drive Pumps
- Kontro Sealless Magnetic Drive Pumps
- Marelli ISO/API Process, Water
- PPI Diaphragm Compressors

== Timeline ==
- 1905—The Rockford Milling Machine Company, owned by Edwin Cedarleaf and brothers Oscar and David Sundstrand, begin operations.
- 1926—The Sundstrand machine Tool Company is formed through the merger of the Rockford Tool Company and the Rockford milling Machine company.
- 1933—The Sundstrand Machine Tool Company sells the first oil burner pump. Hydraulic pumps, motors and valves are also developed.
- HMD Pumps in England invents and engineers the world's first magnet drive pump.
- 1957—Sundstrand develops the first water injection pump for the commercial jet aircraft industry. The pump is designed to boost engine thrust during takeoff.
- 1962—Sundstrand develops the first Sundyne high-speed centrifugal pump and sells it to Shell Chemical.
- 1965—Sundstrand develops a high-speed process gas compressor and sells it to Union Carbide.
- 1970—Sundstrand Fluid Handling Division is established in Denver, Colorado. Nikkiso-Sundstrand Fluid Handling Joint Venture is established in Japan and Sundstrand Fluid Handling opens manufacturing plan in Dijon, France. New division manufactures industrial pumps and compressors and other engineered packaging for the hydrocarbon and chemical processing industries.
- 1994—Sundstrand Fluid Handling acquires Kontro, HMD Sealless Ltd., and SINE Pump.
- 1998—Sundstrand Fluid Handling acquires ANSIMAG Inc. and MASO Process Pumpen.
- 1999—United Technologies Corporation acquires Sundstrand Corporation and merges it with its Hamilton Standard division. The new company, Hamilton-Sundstrand, is headquartered in Windsor Locks, Connecticut. Sundstrand Fluid Handling changes its name and logo to Sundyne Corporation under the Hamilton-Sundstrand Industrial Division.
- 2000—Sundyne acquires Italian manufacturer, Caster Pumps, SRL.
- 2005—Sundyne sells distribution rights to Sundyne Canned Motor Pumps to Nikkiso Co, LTD
- 2007—Sundyne buys half of joint venture partner's interest in the joint venture and renames company to Sundyne Nikkiso
- 2007—eMe Hamilton Sundstrand Electromagnetics Division is moved under Sundyne management.
- 2008—Hamilton Sundstrand acquires Marelli Pumps in Illescas, Toledo, Spain and places them under Sundyne management.
- 2009—Sundyne sells MASO/Sine Process Pumps in Ilsfeld, Germany to Watson-Marlow Pump Group.
- 2010—Sundyne acquires 100% share of Sundyne Nikkiso and renames entity to Sundyne Japan.
- 2012—Sundyne is sold to a joint venture owned by The Carlyle Group and BC Partners
- 2020—Sundyne is sold to Warburg Pincus
- 2025-Sundyne is acquired by Honeywell following a $2.16 billion acquisition.
