= Saurabh Saha =

American biotech entrepreneur

- Education: BSc, MSc, MD, and PhD
- Alma mater: California Institute of Technology; Johns Hopkins University; Harvard University; University of Oxford
- Occupation: Cancer drug discovery
- Known for: Translational medicine Cancer biosurgery

Saurabh Saha is an American biotech entrepreneur.

== Education ==
Saha received his undergraduate degree in biology from the California Institute of Technology. He also attended both Harvard Business School and Oxford University. Saha trained under Bert Vogelstein during his studies at the Johns Hopkins School of Medicine, where he received both an MD and a PhD in cancer genetics.

== Career ==
After finishing graduate school, Saha joined the management consulting firm McKinsey & Company in their Pharmaceuticals and Medical Products Practice in New York City. In 2005, he became the Director of the New Indications Discovery Unit at the Novartis Institutes for BioMedical Research based in Cambridge, Massachusetts. Between 2008 and 2015, Saha served as the President of BioMed Valley Discoveries Saha serves as a venture partner for the life sciences venture capital firm, Atlas Venture and also served as the Chief Medical Officer for its portfolio company, Synlogic.

In 2016, Saha was appointed as President and CEO of Delinia, a biotech company focused on developing novel therapies for the treatment of cancer and autoimmune diseases such as lupus, inflammatory bowel disease, rheumatoid arthritis and others.

Saha has published in periodicals where he and his colleagues reported translational research and development discoveries in cancer research. He is also on the editorial boards of the American Journal of Clinical Oncology, Journal of Translational Medicine, and Cancer Biology & Therapy.
