= G. Roger Edwards =

American archaeologist and curator

George Roger Edwards
- Edwards circa 1950-1960
- Born: October 11, 1914; Southington, Connecticut
- Died: June 9, 2009 (aged 94); Haverford, Pennsylvania

George Roger Edwards (October 11, 1914 – June 9, 2009) was an American archaeologist and curator for the University of Pennsylvania Museum of Archaeology and Anthropology.

== Biography ==
He was born in Southington, Connecticut, on October 11, 1914, to George Edwards and Alice Heathcote. He attended Lewis High School in Southington, Connecticut, then earned an undergraduate degree from Bowdoin College in 1933 and a M.S. from Johns Hopkins University in 1937. He earned a Ph.D. in archaeology from the University of Pennsylvania in 1939.

Edwards became the assistant curator for the Bowdoin College Museum of Art. He moved to Philadelphia in 1950 as assistant professor of classical archaeology and an assistant curator for the University of Pennsylvania Museum of Archaeology and Anthropology. Edwards excavated at several sites including Gordium in Turkey in 1951 and Kourion in Cyprus in 1954. He rose to the position of full professor and retired in 1980 with the title curator emeritus.

He died on June 9, 2009, in Haverford, Pennsylvania.

== Publications ==
- An Ivory (1961)
- Corinth: results of excavations conducted by the American school
- The Gordion Campaign of 1958: Preliminary Report (1959)
- The Potters' Quarter: The Pottery (1984)
