= J. Prentiss Browne =

American architect

John Prentiss Browne (June 1, 1920 – May 22, 2005) was an architect. He designed numerous buildings throughout Maryland, most of them schools and academic buildings, including Loyola University's Donnelly Science Center.

== Early life, education, wartime service ==
Born in Baltimore in 1921, Browne attended the Baltimore Polytechnic Institute (the city's "magnet school" mathematics/science & technology public high school) and graduated from The Johns Hopkins University. After graduating, he worked at the Glenn L. Martin Company aircraft plant in Middle River, Maryland, east of the city during the beginning of World War II, until he joined the United States Marine Corp. He was stationed in Okinawa during the United States occupation of Japan after the war in 1945-1946.

== Donnelly Science Center ==
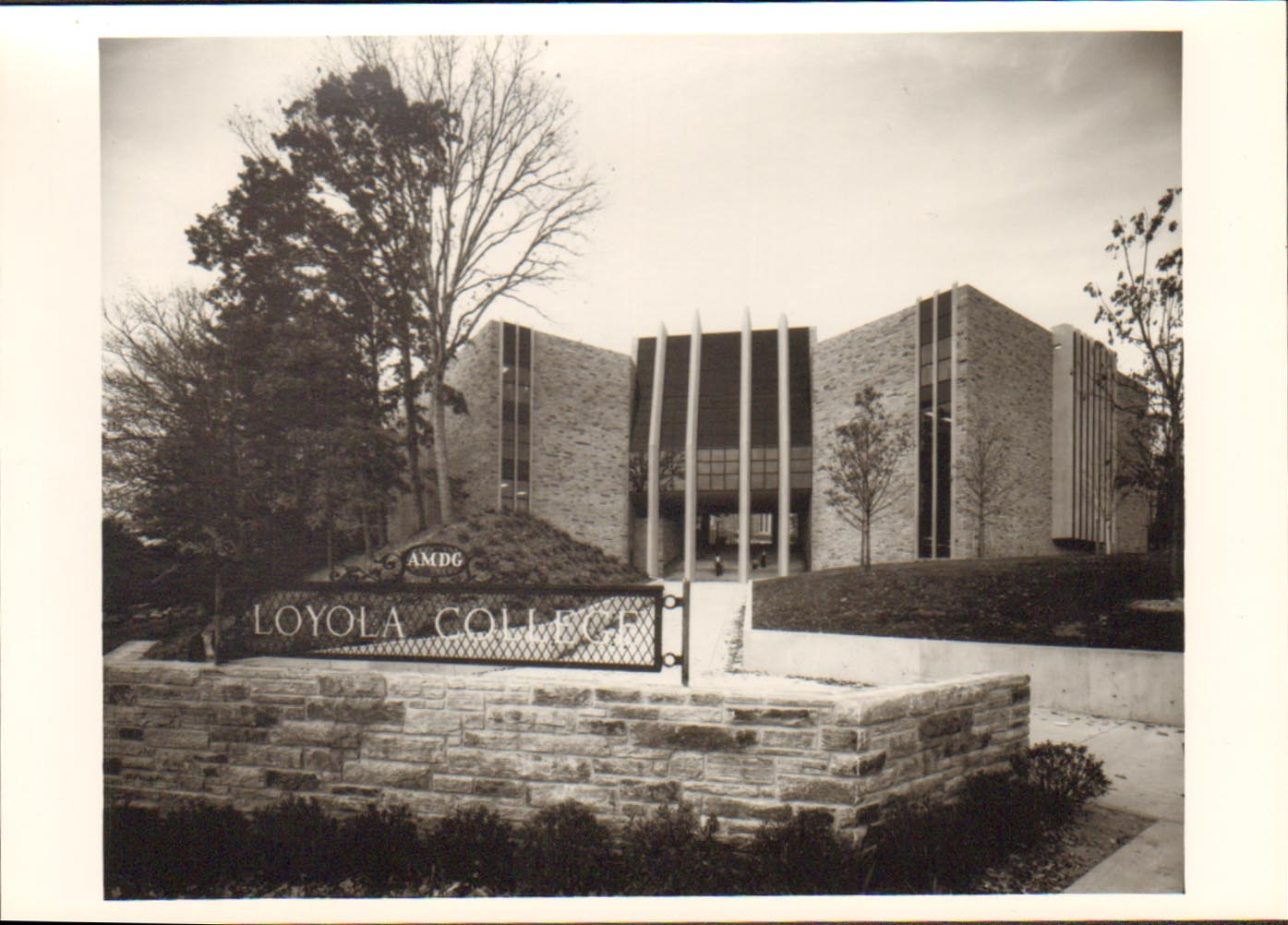
Donnelly Science Center

The Donnelly Science Center was one of his most well-known designs. The site for the building was green space, which prompted debate about whether anything should be built there. But Browne, and then Loyola College, agreed on the plans and the Building was constructed in 1978.

Construction began in the spring of 1978 and was completed by the fall of that year. The $3.9 million building was dedicated on December 3, 1978, and named after Edward J. Donnelly, the largest private donor. The 60,000 square foot building included 25 laboratories, 5 classrooms, offices, and computer facilities. The four-story building, with three floors above the grade, was built on the corner of North Charles Street and Cold Spring Lane. Although the college was excited for the new science center, there was concern about the destruction of the green space and trees on campus. According to Browne, the construction of the center "would not require the cutting of more than a half-dozen of the graceful, mature trees that dot the corner’s hillside." Another concern from the Loyola College community was the want for a formal entrance. The new science center would replace the signboard that was located on Charles Street and would be the largest building on campus.

== Retirement and restoration ==
After he retired in 1982, Browne helped restore historic sites around Maryland. He became a board member and eventually became president of the Flag House & Star-Spangled Banner Museum. At the age of 76, he oversaw the renovation of the museum.
