= Thomas H. Maren =

Dr. Thomas Maren
- Born: 1918; New York City, New York, United States
- Died: August 15, 1999 (aged 80–81); Bar Harbor, Maine
- Education: Princeton University; Johns Hopkins University
- Known for: Inventing Trusopt, serving in World War II
- Awards: Honorary Doctorate from Uppsala University in Sweden
- Scientific career
- Fields: Scientific Research
- Workplaces: University of Florida

Thomas H. Maren (1918 – August 15, 1999) was an American professor of medicine at the University of Florida. He was the founding father for the University of Florida College of Medicine, and he invented Trusopt to help people with glaucoma.

== Life and death ==
Maren was born in New York City, and he served the war effort in World War II. He was educated at Princeton University, and received his medical degree from Johns Hopkins University. He established the first Department of Pharmacology at the University of Florida College of Medicine in 1956. Hr remained Chairman until 1978, and continued to work as a graduate research professor until his death in 1999.

Maren died at the age of 81 of heart failure.

== Education ==
- Bachelor's degree in chemistry from Princeton University in 1938.
- Medical degree from Johns Hopkins University in 1951.

== Awards ==
- Hopkins Distinguished Medical Alumnus Award.
- Honorary Doctorate from Uppsala University.
- Inducted into the Hopkins Society of Scholars.
- Inducted into the Florida Inventors Hall of Fame 2017.
