= William L. Jews =

American businessman and former basketball player

- Born: January 30, 1952 (age 74); Cambridge, Maryland, USA
- Education: B.A., hospital administration, Johns Hopkins University
- Known for: Former CEO of CareFirst BlueCross BlueShield
- Spouse: Marsha Jews
- Children: 1 step-daughter

William L. Jews (born January 30, 1952) is an American businessman and former basketball player.

== Early life and basketball career ==
Jews was born on January 30, 1952, to Mabel Jones and William Jews Sr. in Cambridge, Maryland. His father ran a barbershop while his mother was a teacher. He attended Cambridge High where he played high school basketball. In 1969, Jews set a new school record by recording 40 points in one game, beating the previous record of 38. While attending the segregated school, Jews also became student council treasurer in an uncontested election.

After being accepted into Johns Hopkins University on a basketball scholarship, Jews chose to forgo his freshman season to focus on academics. In his sophomore season, Jews almost considered forgoing another season because he feared it would affect his grades. Once he chose to join the team for the season in December 1971, he was not an immediate success as expected. He was viewed as "timid" and "unsure of himself underneath the basket." He eventually grew more comfortable on the court and was considered "one of the most proficient re-bounders in the Southern Division of the Middle Atlantic Conference." He continued to dominate the court for the Johns Hopkins Blue Jays and was the only junior on the basketball team selected for the Middle Atlantic Conference All-Star team. At the time of his nomination, Jews finished second in conference scoring while averaging nearly 12 rebounds a game.

== Professional career ==
As a junior, Jews selected hospital administration as a career after meeting Ken Richmond, then assistant director at Union Memorial Hospital. After graduating, Jews became an administrative assistant for planning and development, assistant director for facilities operations and assistant director for ambulatory services and director of planning at the Lutheran Hospital of Maryland. He was eventually promoted to administrator of Lutheran Hospital of Maryland in 1981. While serving in this role, he was charged with merging the hospital into the new Liberty Medical Center Inc, which was met with large backlash from some in the black community.

When Liberty Medical Center opened on November 2, 1986, Lutheran's patients were transferred to Liberty, which allowed St. Luke Lutheran Health Care Inc. to rent out space in Lutheran's 1 97-bed building for other uses. At the end of Liberty's 1987 fiscal year, the non-profit facility had generated $647,168 in income, after grossing nearly $40 million in patient revenues. The fiscal 1988 numbers showed a $1.2 million surplus on revenues of $54.7 million. While simultaneously managing Liberty Medical Center Inc., the Lutheran Health Care Corp., and St. Luke Lutheran Holding Company and Nursing Home, Jews was elected to serve on the Maryland National Bank Board of Directors in 1989. In 1990, Jews became president and CEO of Dimensions Health Corp, running two hospitals, two nursing homes and other health facilities.

Jews joined Blue Cross Blue Shield of Maryland in 1993 and created a subsection called CareFirst by combining the Maryland plan with plans serving the rest of the metropolitan Washington area and Delaware. In recognition of his effort to save Blue Cross Blue Shield of Maryland from bankruptcy, he was honored as a master entrepreneur during the 1998 U.S. business awards. Two years later, Jews was recognized as Business Leader of the Year by Loyola College's Sellinger School of Business and Management. However, after attempting to convert CareFirst into a for-profit organization he was met with much scrutiny before the plan was officially rejected in 2003.

In 2006, Jews stepped down as chief executive officer from CareFirst and shortly thereafter joined the board of directors of CACI International Inc. and Ryland Group Inc. In 2016, Jews was listed among Savoy Magazine's Most Influential Black Corporate Directors.
