= Nicholas P. Restifo =

American physician

- Born: 24 July 1960 (age 65); Columbus, Ohio
- Education: Johns Hopkins University, New York University School of Medicine
- Occupation: Immunologist
- Known for: T cell-based immunotherapy

Nicholas P. Restifo (born July 24, 1960) is an American immunologist, physician and educator in cancer immunotherapy. Until July 2019, he was a tenured senior investigator in the intramural National Cancer Institute of the National Institutes of Health at Bethesda, Maryland. Nicholas was an executive vice president of research at Lyell based in San Francisco.

Restifo has been a pioneer in the use of T cell-based immunotherapy.

== Early life and education ==
Restifo was born July 24, 1960, in Columbus, Ohio. He grew up in a small town, Amherst, Ohio, and went to high school in Lorain, Ohio. He completed his undergraduate education with honors at the Johns Hopkins University and obtained his medical degree from New York University School of Medicine. He first joined the National Cancer Institute, NIH in Bethesda, Maryland in 1989. He was recruited from the Memorial Sloan Kettering Cancer Center, where he worked in the laboratory of Murray Brennan, the former chairman of Surgery. He became a principal investigator in 1993 and has authored or co-authored more than 350 papers and book chapters on cancer immunotherapy. His h-index is 156 and his work has been cited more than 104,000 times according to Google Scholar.

== Research ==
Restifo is a pioneer in the field of cancer immunotherapy with a focus on the use of T cells in the treatment of malignancy. One of Dr. Restifo's major discoveries is that CD8+ T cells experience a stereotypical maturational program. His early work was focused on discovering how tumor cells can escape from T cell recognition. He went on to characterize the mechanisms underlying why T cells survive and expand better after lymphodepletion. His most recent efforts include a focus on how elements – literally from the periodic table – influence cancer immunity. These include work on how oxygen can inhibit anti-tumor immunity and how potassium ions from dying cancer cells can shut down the anti-tumor response.

Successful treatment of patients with cancer is the goal of his laboratory, and his therapeutic approaches employ adoptive T cell transfer, gene modification and cellular reprogramming. Basic aspects of tumor and T cell immunology inform novel therapeutic interventions in the clinic.

Restifo and his research team have made contributions to the fields of adoptive cell transfer tumor immune-escape, virally encoded cancer vaccines, adoptive cell transfer for the treatment of cancer, and the biology of self/tumor-reactive T cells, with an emphasis on memory CD8+ T cells.

== Awards ==
Solomon A. Berson Prize for Clinical and Translational Science, 2017 Clarivate Analytics, “World’s Most Influential Scientific Minds” Double Citation in Immunology and Clinical Medicine 2014 (Thomson Reuters) NIH Director’s Award, 2017, Federal Technology Transfer Award, 2017 Primary Organizer of four Keystone Symposia and three International Cancer Immunotherapy Meetings at NIH. Plenary and Keynote Invited talks at AACR, SITC, ASH, ASCGT, AAI and other meetings.

Academic Appointments, primary mentor for PhD students: 2014 Cambridge University, UK; 2011 U of Pennsylvania School of Medicine; 2010 Georgetown U School of Medicine; 2009 George Wash U School of Medicine.

== See also ==
- Cytotoxic T cell
- interleukin 15
- memory t cell
- Cish
