= Deborah Gross =

American professor of nursing

- Citizenship: USA
- Education: University of Michigan; Rush University
- Known for: Promoting positive parent-child relationship, Social determinants and health and poverty
- Awards: Fellow AAN; Robert Woord Johnson Executive Nurse Leadership Program, Fellow; Edge Runner AAN; International Researcher Hall of Fame, Sigma Nursing
- Scientific career
- Fields: Psychiatric and mental health nursing Parenting
- Workplaces: Pace University; Rush University; Johns Hopkins University
- Website: nursing.jhu.edu/faculty_research/faculty/faculty-directory/deborah-gross

Deborah Gross is an American professor of nursing. She is best known for her contributions to improving positive parent-child relationships and preventing behavior problems in preschool children from low-income neighborhoods

== Biography ==
Gross earned her BS (1975) in nursing at the University of Michigan and her DNSc (1983) at Rush University. From 2006 through 2009, she completed the Robert Wood Johnson Foundation Executive Nurse Leadership Program.

Prior to joining the faculty at Johns Hopkins University, where she is currently the Leonard and Helen Stulman Endowed Professor in psychiatric and mental health nursing, she served in multiple roles at Rush University including: Professor of Nursing, Chairperson of Women's and Children's Health Nursing, and Associate Dean for Research and Scholarship in the College of Nursing. From 1983 through 1987, Gross was an assistant professor at Pace University.

In 1992, Gross was inducted as a Fellow of the American Academy of Nursing, and in 2007 she was selected as one of the first Edge Runners by the American Academy of Nursing for, "developing a model program demonstrating how nurse leaders are offering solutions to health care challenges." In 2012, Sigma Theta Tau inducted Gross into the International Researcher Hall of Fame.

== Contributions to promoting positive parent-child relationships ==
Gross pioneered the development of the Chicago Parent Program, which demonstrates that a group-based parent management training (PMT) program is just as effective in decreasing child behavior problems as is Parent-Child Interaction Therapy (PCIT) — often considered the “gold standard” among PMT programs. A major advantage of the PMT program approach is lower cost, with each participant costing approximately 50% less for PMT as compared to PCIT.

== Contributions to mentoring nurse leaders as policy scholars ==
With support from Jonas Philanthropies and in partnership with the American Academy of Nursing, Gross developed the Academy Jonas Policy Scholars Program to train emerging nurse leadership as policy scholars.
