= Patrick Maggitti =

American academic

Patrick Maggitti has been provost of Villanova University since 2015. He is the university's first provost.

== Early life and education ==
Maggitti was born and raised in Whitehall Township, Pennsylvania, the fifth of six children. He attended Allentown Central Catholic High School in Allentown, Pennsylvania, and then Saint Joseph's University in Philadelphia, where he received a Bachelor of Science in chemistry and an MBA with honors from Johns Hopkins University in Baltimore, and a PhD in strategic management from the University of Maryland in 2006.

== Career ==
Maggitti spent nearly 15 years in the steel and mining industries, where he founded two companies and held a variety of roles, including chief executive officer, director of national sales, and board member. He has also consulted with several Fortune 500 on various facets of strategy and entrepreneurship.

Maggitti served as the Helen and William O’Toole Dean of the Villanova School of Business, where he was a faculty member since 2008, and is also associate professor of Strategic Management and Entrepreneurship and the former Carmen and Sharon Danella Director of the Center for Innovation, Creativity, and Entrepreneurship (ICE Center) at the Villanova School of Business.

Maggitti has written for Research Policy, Journal of Management Studies, and Academy of Management Journal.

Maggitti’s research interests focus on dynamic processes, including strategy, innovation, entrepreneurship, and market- and non-market-based competition. His research is highly cited by other scholars, and a 2008 article he coauthored was identified by the Academy of Management as among the best papers for thought leadership in the field of entrepreneurship.

== Publications ==
- Creativity Requires A Culture That Respects Effort And Failure; Maggitti, P.G. 2013.
- Top Management Attention to Innovation: The Role of Search Selection and Intensity in New Product Introductions; Qiang, Li; Maggitti, P.G.; Smith, Ken; Tesluk, Paul; Katila, Riitta 2012.
- TMT Potency and Strategic Decision-Making in HighTechnology Firms; Maggitti, P.G., Clark, K.D. 2012
- Market Watch: Information and Availability Cascades Among The Media And Investors In The U.S. IPO Market; Pollock, T.G., Rindova, V., Maggitti, P.G. 2008.
- The Red Queen Effect: Competitive Action and Performance; Derfus, P.J., Maggitti, P.G., Grimm, C.M., Smith, K.G. 2008
- Leadership in Hypercrisis: Leading in the Face of a Shaken Culture; Maggitti, P.G., Slay, H., Clark, K.D. 2010.
- Administrative and Strategic Advantages of HRIS; Kovachs, K.A., Fagan, P., Maggitti, P.G. 2002.
- Top Management Team Confidence; Clark, K.D., Maggitti, P.G. 2011.
- Globalization and Corporate Partnering; Doh, J., Clark, K.D., Maggitti, P.G. 2008.
- Bisociation; Maggitti, P.G., Smith, K. G. 2005.
- Looking Back: Does Acquisition Experience Make or Break Future Deals?;Maggitti, P.G. 2002.
