= Jay Clark Brown =

American molecular biologist

- Occupations: Molecular biologist, microbiologist, virologist, and academic

Academic background
- Education: B.Sc. in Biology; PhD in Biochemistry
- Alma mater: Johns Hopkins University; Harvard University; MRC Laboratory of Molecular Biology
- Thesis: (1969)

Jay Clark Brown is an American molecular biologist, microbiologist, virologist, and academic. He is a professor emeritus in the Department of microbiology, immunology, and cancer biology at the University of Virginia School of Medicine.

Brown is most known for his work in the field of molecular biology, computational biology, genomics, structural biology, and microbiology with a particular focus on the structure and assembly of herpes simplex virus, human papilloma virus and Human gene expression. He is the co-author of two books including, Medical Cell Biology and Basic Microbiology.

Brown is an Academic Editor of Advances in Virology.

== Education ==
Brown enrolled at Johns Hopkins University, in 1964, and graduated with a BSc in biology. He then undertook research in the area of Biochemistry and Molecular Biology at Harvard University, and earned his Ph.D. in 1969, under the mentorship of Paul M. Doty. Following the completion of his Ph.D., he received a post-doctoral NATO fellowship in molecular biology and joined the MRC Laboratory of Molecular Biology at Cambridge, where he worked under the supervision of Francis Crick.

== Career ==
After completing his post-doc in 1971, Brown joined the Department of Microbiology in the School of Medicine at the University of Virginia as Assistant Professor and ascended through the ranks to Professor in 1987. During the summers between 1977 and 1980 he also held an appointment at the Marine Biological Laboratory at Woods Hole, Massachusetts, where he taught Physiology. He is currently a professor emeritus of microbiology, immunology, and cancer biology at University of Virginia School of Medicine.

He held appointments as a vice-chair in 1998 and a chair in 1999, under the cancer study section at the American Cancer Society.

== Research ==
Brown's research primarily focuses on the areas of molecular biology and microbiology. At the beginning of his career, he explored several aspects of molecular biology, with a particular focus on the genetic code. Later his work was aimed at understanding the fundamentals of microbiology and virology and several aspects related to it. Thereafter, he and his team began to work on the structural and functional properties of herpes simplex virus. More recently, he has branched out into human gene expression.

Brown's current research revolves around the control of human gene expression and Organization of transcription factor binding sites in the promoters of human genes. He has co-written more than 100 peer-reviewed articles for leading journals and has been cited broadly throughout his career.

=== Molecular Biology ===
Brown began his work in molecular biology with a substantial interest in the genetic code. During his PhD, under the supervision of Paul Doty, he proposed the development of new methods to synthesize oligonucleotides of defined sequence and studied their coding properties. Subsequently, he demonstrated that the incorporation of N-formylmethionine is stimulated by oligonucleotide messengers that contain the sequence AUG near or at the 5' end of the messenger RNA chain and that it does not stimulate unformulated methionine. He further revealed that AUG is capable of encoding methionine for both initiating and extension methionines.

Following that Brown has worked on the surface glycoproteins and revealed a cell surface glycoprotein characterized as a differentiated state of neuroblastoma C-1300 cells. In his research, he has elucidated significant differences in the amounts of 4 glycopeptide classes extracted from vertebrate cells and also detected a glycopeptide which was only present during the cell-division period and named it glycol-peptide 4. He also identified differential properties of cell surface membrane from the internal membrane, and particularly highlighted that the isolation of glycoproteins with smooth membrane fraction of cell homogenates characterizes them from internal glycoproteins. Based on these criteria, he isolated two molecular weight classes of glycoproteins as the constituents of the plasma membrane of mouse L-929 cells and suggested that band 1 polypeptide might be efficiently involved in regulating L cell growth.

Whilst working on gene expression, he proposed that for the protection of promoter's ability to regulate gene expression from the mutagenic damage the transcription binding sites of promoters are arrayed in multiple forms and ascertained supportive evidence in brain and liver-specific gene expression.

=== Microbiology ===
Brown has worked widely on vesicular stomatitis virus, herpes simplex virus, and human papilloma virus. His research justified the view that the vesicular stomatitis virus matrix M (VSV-M) protein plays a vital role in the maintenance of nucleocapsid in a compact form and mentioned the possibility of identical functionality of VSV-M in-vivo. While working on the physical characteristics of N protein of vesicular stomatitis virus through electron microscopy images he inferred that the N protein has a bilobed structure and is wedge-shaped with an approximate 9.0 nm, 5.0 nm, and 3.3 nm of length, depth, and width respectively. In 1991, he started working on Human papilloma virus and published its structure using cryoelectron microscopy. His work clarified that the structural capsid hexon of the human papilloma virus is molecular pentameres.

A major part of Brown's work was on herpes simplex virus (HSV) and mainly focuses on its structure and assembly to determine properties that can aid in the development of novel anti-herpes therapeutic drugs. He illustrated the molecular composition of the capsid pentons and the triplexes of HSV 1 using the guanidine-HCl extraction and discovered that the protein of abortive capsids of equine herpes virus is entirely encapsulated within the capsid. Later, he detected that the HSV capsid assembles in a cell-free environment with the help of four capsid proteins, including VP5 as the major capsid protein, VP22a as a scaffolding protein and VP19c and VP23 as triplex proteins. In related research, he discovered that a mature, icosahedral herpes simplex virus capsid is formed by a spherical intermediate named procapsid, studied the maturation of procapsid through cryoelectron microscopy and described the distinct structural and conformational changes that occur when a procapsid and is transformed into a mature one. Furthermore, he identified the portal that allows entry and exit of herpes virus DNA from the capsid, at the capsid vertex and also demonstrated the isolation of intact capsid from insect cells that produce pUL6 protein.

== Bibliography ==
=== Books ===
- Volk, Wesley A.; Brown, Jay C. (1997). Basic Microbiology. Benjamin Cummings. ISBN 978-0-673-99560-5.
- Flickinger, Charles J. (1979). Medical Cell Biology. Saunders. ISBN 978-0-7216-3721-1.

=== Selected articles ===
- Brown, Jay C.; Newcomb, William W.; Lawrenz-Smith, Susan (December 1988). "pH-dependent accumulation of the vesicular stomatitis virus glycoprotein at the ends of intact virions". Virology. 167 (2): 625–629. doi:10.1016/0042-6822(88)90126-2. PMID 2849241.
- Homa, Fred L.; Brown, Jay C. (July 1997). "Capsid assembly and DNA packaging in herpes simplex virus". Reviews in Medical Virology. 7 (2): 107–122. doi:10.1002/(SICI)1099-1654(199707)7:2<107::AID-RMV191>3.0.CO;2-M. PMID 10398476.
- Copeland, Anna Maria; Newcomb, William W.; Brown, Jay C. (15 February 2009). "Herpes Simplex Virus Replication: Roles of Viral Proteins and Nucleoporins in Capsid-Nucleus Attachment". Journal of Virology. 83 (4): 1660–1668. doi:10.1128/jvi.01139-08. PMC 2643781. PMID 19073727.
- Brown, Jay C. (13 February 2021). "Role of Gene Length in Control of Human Gene Expression: Chromosome-Specific and Tissue-Specific Effects". International Journal of Genomics. 2021: 1–8. doi:10.1155/2021/8902428. PMC 7911607. PMID 33688492.
- Brown, Jay C. (29 August 2022). "Control of Expression Level in Human Genes: Observations with Apoptosis Genes and Genes Involved in B cell Development". Journal of Bioinformatics and Systems Biology. 5 (3): 108–115.
