= Michael Stewart (music executive) =

Michael Stewart was an American music executive. He began his career as an independent music publisher, then served as president of United Artists Music and vice president of United Artists Pictures. Stewart is credited with bringing the Beatles to United Artists for films, recordings and publishing. After resigning from United Artists, he joined with the West German firm Bertelsmann to form Interworld Music Group. Stewart was later the president of CBS Music Publishing, and he served as the consultant to the MCA Music Division.

== Life and career ==
A native of Baltimore, Maryland, Stewart earned an aeronautical engineering degree from Johns Hopkins University. In the late 1950s, Stewart's interest in acting brought him to New York where he eventually became an artists manager and record producer. During this period, he created the music companies Korwin Music and Dominion Music.

In 1962, Stewart sold his publishing interest to United Artists Corporation. He joined the company as the Executive Vice President of United Artists' music publishing subsidiaries. He then held the position of executive vice president of the Music and Record Division. In 1966, Stewart was named President of United Artists Records and Music Publishing Companies. He served as chairman and president of United Artists Music Group for 15 years. As the head of that division, he acquired various copyrights, including all the Beatles' soundtracks and the Broadway show Hair. In 1973, Stewart negotiated the acquisition of MGM's publishing division. He was also the vice president of United Artists' motion picture division for more than a decade. In that role, he supervised around numerous film soundtracks, including A Hard Day’s Night, Rocky and various James Bond film scores. Stewart resigned from United Artists to form Interworld Music Group, a joint venture with Bertelsmann of West Germany, in 1977.

Stewart was elected to board positions at ASCAP from 1975 to 1989 and at the National Music Publishers' Association from 1976 to 1993.

After Stewart sold his 50% interest to Bertelsmann in 1981, he became the president of CBS Music Publishing. In 1982, he created the music publishing division CBS Songs. In 1982, he negotiated the CBS acquisition of MGM/United Artists music publishing division, which included Big 3 Print. He sold Big 3 to Columbia Pictures Publications.

In 1987, Stewart was named head of Evergreen Entertainment Group, Los Angeles. That year, Stewart and his wife Gabriela formed the film company Eastern Epic in India, which produced films for the Asian market.

In 1988, Stewart began serving as a consultant to the MCA Music Division, concentrating on the Japanese market. He remained at Universal until his health deteriorated.

Stewart died at the age of 70 from cancer at his Beverly Hills home on March 22, 1999. He was survived by his wife.
