= Andrew Mertha =

American political scientist

Academic background
- Education: University of Michigan

Academic work
- Institutions: Johns Hopkins University; Cornell University; Washington University in St. Louis
- Main interests: Bureaucracy, Institutions, Leninist Party Systems, Policy Making and Implementation, US-China Relations

Andrew Mertha is an American political scientist and the Inaugural Director of the SAIS China Global Research Center at Paul H. Nitze School of Advanced International Studies (SAIS) of Johns Hopkins University. He is a scholar of Chinese and Cambodian politics with a particular emphasis on bureaucracy, institutions, Leninist Party Systems, policymaking and implementation, and China–United States relations. Mertha speaks Khmer, Mandarin, French, and Hungarian. He is one of few American scholars on China-Cambodia relations due to his proficiency in Khmer.

== Education ==
Mertha holds a BA and PhD in Political Science from the University of Michigan.

== Academic career ==
Mertha has worked and researched in China and Cambodia: he lived in China for seven years as an English teacher (1988–1989), a representative for a toy company (1991–1994, 1995, and 1996), and a scholar (from 1998). He has been conducting field and archival work in Cambodia since 2009.

Mertha joined the Paul H. Nitze School of Advanced International Studies (SAIS) in 2018 and served as the Vice Dean for Faculty Affairs and International Research Cooperation from 2019 to 2021. At SAIS, he teaches courses such as Leadership in China and Contemporary Chinese politics. Before he joined SAIS, he was a Professor and Associate Professor in the Department of Government at Cornell University from 2008 to 2018. He was also the director of Cornell's China and Asia-Pacific Studies programs and a core faculty member in the East Asia and Southeast Asia programs. From 2001 to 2008, he served as an Assistant Professor in the Department of Political Science/Program in International and Area Studies at the Washington University in St. Louis.

Mertha has authored three monographs: The Politics of Piracy: Intellectual Property in Contemporary China (Cornell University Press, 2005), China’s Water Warriors: Citizen Action and Policy Change (Cornell University Press, 2008), and Brothers in Arms: Chinese Aid to the Khmer Rouge, 1975–1979 (Cornell University Press, 2014). He published an edited volume, May Ehara’s Svay: A Cambodian Village, with an Introduction by Judy Ledgerwood, in 2018.

In 2006, Mertha testified for the US-China Economic and Security Review Commission and briefed the Congressional-Executive Commission on China. He was part of congressional delegation to Beijing, Xinjiang, and Shanghai to discuss terrorism and narcotics trafficking.

Mertha is on the board of directors of the Center for Khmer Studies, the only American Overseas Research Center in mainland Southeast Asia. He is a member of the National Committee on U.S.-China Relations, and an alumnus of its Public Intellectuals Program, 2008–2010, a fellowship program that aims to strengthen links among U.S. academics, policymakers, opinion leaders, and the public to increase Americans' understanding of China. He is also a member of the American Political Science Association, Association for Asian Studies, and International Studies Association and sits on several editorial committees of Journal of Comparative Politics, The China Quarterly, and Asian Survey.

== Publications ==
=== Monographs ===
- The Politics of Piracy: Intellectual Property in Contemporary China (Cornell University Press, 2005)
- China’s Water Warriors: Citizen Action and Policy Change (Cornell University Press, 2008)
- Brothers in Arms: Chinese Aid to the Khmer Rouge, 1975–1979 (Cornell University Press, 2014)
- Bad Lieutenants: The Khmer Rouge, United Front, and Class Struggle, 1970–1997 (Cornell University Press, 2025)

=== Edited volumes ===
- Svay: A Khmer Village in Cambodia, Edited by Andrew Mertha, and Introduction by Judy Ledgerwood (Cornell University Press, 2018)

=== Selected scholarly journal articles ===
- ‘Stressing Out’: Cadre Calibration and Affective Proximity to the CCP in Reform-Era China (The China Quarterly 229, March 2017)
- International Disorganization: Fragmentation and Foreign Policy in SinoCambodian Relations, 1975-1979 (Issues & Studies 51(1), 2015)
- “Surrealpolitik: The Experience of Chinese Experts in Democratic Kampuchea, 1975–1979 (Cross-Currents 4, September 2012)
- Fragmented Authoritarianism 2.0: Political Pluralization of the Chinese Policy Process,” (The China Quarterly 200, December 2009)
- Unbuilt Dams: Seminal Events and Policy Change, with William Lowry, (Comparative Politics 39 1, October 2006)

=== Selected chapters in edited volumes ===
- A Half Century of Engagement: The Study of China and the Role of the China Scholar Community: Engaging China: Fifty Years of Sino-American Relations, edited by Ann Thurston (Columbia University Press, 2021)
- Rectification in Afterlives of Chinese Communism: Political Concepts from Mao to Xi, edited by Ivan Franceschini, Nicholas Loubere, and Christian Sorace (Australian National University Press, 2019)
- Chapter 17: Navigating the Bureaucracy: A Foundational Primer on Policy Making in China,” in The Sage Handbook of Contemporary China (Sage Publications, 2018)
- Introduction (with Kjeld Erik Brødsgaard), in Brødsgaard, ed., Chinese Politics as Fragmented Authoritarianism: Earthquakes, Energy and Environment ( Routledge, 2017)
- Chapter 10: "China" in Case Studies in Comparative Politics edited by David Samuels (Pearson/Longman & Co, 2012)
- Society in the State: China’s Nondemocratic Political Pluralization,” State and Society in 21st Century China, edited by Stanley Rosen and Peter Hays Gries (Routledge, 2010)
