= Hey-Kyoung Lee =

Neuroscientist

Hey-Kyoung Lee is a neuroscience professor at Johns Hopkins University. She studies cross-modal plasticity between visual and auditory systems.

== Early life ==
Lee's mother is a chemist and her father is a physicist. She completed her undergraduate degree in biology at the Yonsei University in Korea. During her junior year at Yonsei University, Lee participated in an exchange program at Brown University in New Providence, RI

== Early academic career ==
Lee completed her Ph.D. in neuroscience in the lab of Mark Bear. Lee developed a chemical protocol for inducing plasticity, specifically to induce LTD by dephosphorylating an AMPA receptor subunit.

Lee trained as a postdoc in the lab of Richard Huganir at Johns Hopkins University, with whom she had previously collaborated as a graduate student. She found that older rats with uncompromised memory formation and cognition were still able to adjust the strength of synapses as opposed to those with compromised cognition, due to the utilization of a different mechanism than younger rats. Huganir and Lee ultimately devised with a three-stage model of AMPA receptor phosphorylation in synaptic plasticity.

Lee has also worked with Phillip Wong at the Johns Hopkins School of Medicine to study alterations in synaptic plasticity mechanisms in murine models of Alzheimer's disease. Later, as a biology professor at University of Maryland, Lee used nicotine in conjunction with an enzyme inhibiting drug to reduce the progression of Alzheimer's disease with minimal side effects.

== Recent work ==
Lee joined University of Maryland at College Park as an assistant professor of biology after completing her postdoctoral training. Lee later joined Johns Hopkins Medical School, where she is a tenured professor. Lee's recent work studies plasticity of the visual cortex, particularly in the context of multisensory interaction. Lee studies cross-modal plasticity, particularly cross-model recruitment, when vision is lost. Cross-modal plasticity is a phenomenon in which sensory loss can result in functional changes in other sensory modalities. Lee teamed up with one of her colleagues, Patrick Kanold, to investigate whether or not cross-modal plasticity could occur upon the completion of early childhood. To induce cross-modal plasticity, Lee temporarily blinded mice, depriving them of all visible light in a dark chamber, leading to cross-modal recruitment in the auditory cortex. After a week in the dark chamber, Lee and her team found that there was a redistribution of the allocation of neurons in the auditory cortex corresponding to frequencies of sound. Lee's conclusions suggested that sensory deprivation can be used to aid adults with cochlear implants better process sound signals. She used optogenetics to study specific cortical synapses in isolation using light in order to determine synaptic strength, which is mediated by LTP and LTD. Lee found that the main change in the visual cortex when vision is lost is the potentiation of intracortical synapses.

== Awards ==
Lee received the Sloan Research Fellowship in Neuroscience in 2004 through the Alfred P. Sloan Foundation.
