= Lynne M. Angerer =

Developmental biologist

Lynne Marie Musgrave Angerer
- Born: December 7, 1944; Fort Sill, Oklahoma
- Died: March 3, 2013 (aged 68); Washington, D.C.
- Education: Ohio State University (B. S., 1966) (M.S., 1967) Johns Hopkins University (Ph. D., 1973)
- Known for: sea urchin in situ hybridization
- Spouse: Robert C. Angerer
- Children: Jennifer Lynne Angerer & Mark Alan Angerer
- Scientific career
- Fields: Developmental Biologist
- Workplaces: University of Rochester
- Thesis: Physical and chemical studies on the structure of whole and selectively deproteinized deoxyribonucleoproteins from calf thymus (1973)

Lynne Marie Musgrave Angerer (December 7, 1944 – March 30, 2013) was a developmental biologist most notable for research with sea urchin development during her time spent as Head of the Developmental Mechanisms (NIDCR) at the National Institutes of Health (NIH). She worked at the University of Rochester and received her PhD at Johns Hopkins University studying chromatin structures.

== Sea urchin research ==
Lynne Angerer is best known for her research of determining the cellular fates of cells in sea urchins. With her sea urchin work she was able to develop a method of in situ hybridization through the use of RNA probes. Another breakthrough developed by Angerer was the use of morpholino-substituted antisense oligonucleotides in the sea urchin to knock down and interfere with individual genes. This is achieved through the usual configuration of expression a ribosome attached with a phosphodiester bond being replaced by morpholine ring attached with a phosphodiamidate linkage; this process prevents the ribosome from attaching and this specific gene is not expressed. Both of these procedures she developed are now the industry standard.

Angerer also discovered that specific neurons derive from a unique tissue in an organism's gut, this finding challenged the central dogma which previously stated that neurons only derived from embryonic tissues. Angerer and her husband Robert played a major role in the sequencing the sea urchin genome for the first time. The sequences that she found are used widely in sea urchin studies.
