= Julie Brahmer =

American thoracic oncologist

- Born: Nebraska, USA
- Spouse: Michael G. Nast (m. 2004; died 2004)

Academic background
- Education: BSc, Chemistry and Philosophy, 1989, Creighton University; MD, 1993, University of Nebraska Medical Center

Julie Renee Brahmer is an American thoracic oncologist. She is the co-director of the Upper Aerodigestive Department within the Bloomberg~Kimmel Institute for Cancer Immunotherapy at Johns Hopkins University and the Marilyn Meyerhoff Professor in Thoracic Oncology.

== Early life and education ==
Brahmer was born and raised in Nebraska to a farmer father and nurse mother. She graduated cum laude from Creighton University in 1989 with a Bachelor of Science degree in Chemistry and Philosophy. Brahmer then earned her medical degree in 1993 at the University of Nebraska Medical Center. Following her medical degree, Brahmer completed her internship and residency in Internal Medicine at the University of Utah. After being appointed Chief Medical Resident, she completed her fellowship in Medical Oncology at the Kimmel Cancer Center at Johns Hopkins University.

== Career ==
Upon completing her fellowship, Brahmer joined the faculty at Johns Hopkins (JHU) in 2001. During her early tenure at JHU, Brahmer participated as a researcher on a trial for an immune checkpoint inhibitor drug called MDX-1106 (nivolumab). In 2010, she oversaw the first in-human, open-label, phase I, dose-escalation study of MDX-1106 in refractory solid tumors. As a result of her research into the treatment and prevention of lung cancer and mesothelioma, Brahmer was appointed a member of the American Society of Clinical Oncology and the Eastern Cooperative Oncology Group Thoracic Committee and Cancer Prevention Steering Committee. She was also elected to the Scientific Advisory Board for the LUNGevity Foundation. Brahmer also became a founding board member of the National Lung Cancer Partnership and sat on the Lung Cancer Research Foundation's Medical Advisory Board.

In January 2015, Brahmer was appointed director of the Thoracic Oncology Program at the Johns Hopkins Kimmel Cancer Center. The following month, she was recognised as the March LUNGevity Hero for her work in the field of immunotherapy for lung cancer patients. Brahmer also expanded on her original research on nivolumab and found that people with squamous-non-small cell lung cancer who received nivolumab lived, on average, 3.2 months longer than those receiving chemotherapy.

In 2015, Brahmer collaborated with oncologist Russell Hales and thoracic surgeon Richard Battafarano to launch a multidisciplinary lung cancer program within the Kimmel Cancer Center. As such, she was appointed director of the newly created program at the Kimmel Cancer Center in January 2015. In this new role, Brahmer expanded on her research into targeted immunotherapy to focus on how it can benefit those with lung cancer mutations with lower levels of the PD-L1 protein. Brahmer was also promoted to professor of oncology at the Johns Hopkins School of Medicine while serving in this new role.

On June 1, 2022, Brahmer was named the inaugural recipient of the Marilyn Meyerhoff Professorship in Oncology within the Sidney Kimmel Cancer Center at Johns Hopkins. She was also recognized by Clarivate Analytics as being among the top cited researchers in her field.

== Personal life ==
Brahmer married Michael G. Nast in June 2004. He died later in December while scuba diving in Mexico.
