= Erika Moore Taylor =

Biomedical engineer

Erika Moore Taylor is an American biomedical engineer, scientist, assistant professor, "Forbes 30 under 30 honoree," financial advisor, and the founder of a scholarship program that has been featured on CNBC.

== Biography ==
In 2013, Erika received a Bachelor of Science in biomedical engineering from Johns Hopkins University in Baltimore, Maryland. In 2018, she went on to obtain a Doctor of Philosophy in biomedical engineering at Duke University in Durham, North Carolina. She returned to Johns Hopkins University in 2018 and remained there as a Provost's Postdoctoral Fellow until 2020. Taylor currently works as an assistant professor in the Department of Materials Science and Engineering at the University of Florida in Gainesville. She "specializes in the use of biomaterials to alter the immune response of the body." She is aiming in particular to discover "applications for the autoimmune disorder lupus."

== Distinctions ==
Taylor has earned many distinctions. Here is a selection of them:

- 2017 Duke University Board of Trustees - Graduate Young Trustee
- 2017 MIT Rising Stars in Biomedical Engineering and Science
- 2018 Duke University Department of Biomedical Engineering - BME Award for Outstanding Doctoral Dissertation
- 2021 Duke University Center of Exemplary Mentoring (UCEM) Research Summit - Keynote Speaker

== Awards and honors ==
Taylor received numerous scholarships, fellowships, and endowments. Here are some of her winnings:

- 2009 Johns Hopkins University - Hodson-Gilliam Success Scholar
- 2012 U.N.C.F./Merck Science Initiative - U.N.C.F./Merck Undergraduate Research Fellowship
- 2013 Ford Foundation Fellowship
- 2013 The Graduate School of Duke University - Dean's Graduate Fellowship
- 2013 The Graduate School of Duke University - James B. Duke Fellowship
- 2013 National Science Foundation - NSF Graduate Research Fellow
- Herbert Wertheim College of Engineering at UF - Rhines Rising Star Larry Hench Professorship

== Societies ==
- Tau Beta Pi National Engineering Honor Society

== Publications ==
Taylor has published many academic works including:

- CD45+ Cells Present Within Mesenchymal Stem Cell Populations Affect Network Formation of Blood-Derived Endothelial Outgrowth Cells

Erica B. Peters, Nicolas Christoforou, Erika Moore, Jennifer L. West, and George A. Truskey - BioResearch Open Access, Vol. 4, No. 1 (2015)

- Tumor Necrosis Factor Improves Vascularization in Osteogenic Grafts Engineered with Human Adipose-Derived Stem/Stromal Cells

Daphne L. Hutton, Renu Kondragunta, Erika Moore, Ben P. Hung, Xiaofeng Jia, Warren L. Grayson (2014)

- Platelet-Derived Growth Factor and Spatiotemporal Cues Induce Development of Vascularized Bone Tissue by Adipose-Derived Stem Cells

Daphne L. Hutton, Erika M. Moore, Jeffrey M. Gimble, and Warren L. Grayson - Tissue Engineering Part A Vol. 19, No. 17-18 (2013)

- Vascular morphogenesis of adipose-derived stem cells is mediated by heterotypic cell-cell interactions

Daphne L Hutton, Elizabeth A Logsdon, Erika M Moore, Feilim Mac Gabhann, Jeffrey M Gimble, Warren L Grayson - Tissue Eng Part A (2012)

- Cost-effective therapeutic hypothermia treatment device for hypoxic ischemic encephalopathy

Kim J, Buchbinder N, Ammanuel S, Kim R, Moore E, O'Donnell N, Lee J, Kulikowicz E, Acharya S, Lee R, Johnston M (2013)
