= Willis Maddrey =

American physician

Willis Maddrey is an American physician and internist specializing in diseases of the liver. He is a professor emeritus at the University of Texas Southwestern Medical Center.

== Education ==
Maddrey graduated from Wake Forest University in 1960 and received his M.D. degree from the Johns Hopkins University School of Medicine in 1964. He was a resident and chief resident in the Osler Medical Service at Johns Hopkins Hospital and served a fellowship in liver disease at Yale University School of Medicine.

== Career ==
From 1970 to 1981 he was a professor at the Hopkins School of Medicine, where he directed the liver unit. From 1982 to 1990 he was the Magee Professor and Chairman of the Department of Medicine at Thomas Jefferson University Medical College. In 1990 he moved to the University of Texas Southwestern Medical Center, where he was named the Adelyn and Edmund M. Hoffman Distinguished Chair in Medical Science and given the Arnold N. and Carol S. Ablon Professorship in Biomedical Science. He also served as Executive Vice President for Clinical Affairs.

In 1981 he served as president of the American Association for the Study of Liver Diseases, and in 1992–93 as president of the American College of Physicians.
