= Managed by Q =

- Industry: Office management
- Founded: 2014
- Founder: Saman Rahmanian, Dan Teran
- Headquarters: New York City, New York, United States
- Number of employees: 100 (2020)
- Parent: Eden
- Website: https://www.managedbyq.com/

Managed by Q was an office management platform company based in New York City. The company was founded in 2014 by Saman Rahmanian and Dan Teran as a management platform including vendors for cleaning and maintenance services. In 2017 the company launched their marketplace which expanded their services to include IT support, inventory management, administrative staffing, and security.

Managed by Q operated as an independently run business as part of shared workspace provider WeWork and maintained offices in New York City, Chicago, San Francisco, Los Angeles, and Boston.

On March 3, 2020, Eden bought Managed by Q from WeWork for $25 million.

== History ==
Managed by Q launched out of beta in New York City in 2015, expanding to Chicago. Later in 2015, the company raised $15 million in Series A funding and expanded to San Francisco. The round was led by RRE Ventures; other investors included entrepreneurs Gary Vaynerchuk and Fabrice Grinda, American actress Jessica Alba, and former NBA commissioner David Stern.

In 2016, the company raised $25 million in funding. Investors included Google Ventures (GV) and Kapor Capital. Following another fundraising round that increased to $30 million, M. G. Siegler of GV joined Managed by Q's board. Later in 2016, the company partnered with office supply retailer Staples Inc. Also that year, the company expanded to Chicago, San Francisco, and Los Angeles.

In 2016, Managed by Q announced its "Operator Stock Option Program", which, in addition to previously provided benefits such as 401(k) funds and health insurance, would provide stock option grants to field staff. U.S. Labor Secretary Tom Perez attended the announcement and commended the company.

MIT Sloan conducted a case study in 2016 on Managed by Q's growth strategies. The study identified growth strategies employed by the company that were comparable to elements in "The Good Jobs Strategy", a book written by MIT Adjunct Associate Professor Zeynep Ton. The book's thesis argues that "when a company deploys its workforce in smart ways, its workers can be a driver of profit rather than a driver of cost."

In 2017, Managed by Q launched a marketplace platform accessible by customers and workers which expanded their services to include IT support, inventory management, administrative staffing, and security, along with standard cleaning and maintenance. Later in 2017, Managed by Q acquired the task management software provider Hivy, an eFounders startup.

In 2018, Managed by Q launched in Boston. Later that year the company acquired NVS, an office space planning and management service.

In January 2019, Managed by Q announced they had raised an additional $55 million as part of their Series C funding round. Investors included GV once again as well as RRE.

In April 2019, Managed by Q announced they accepted an offer to be acquired by WeWork. As part of its integration with WeWork, Managed by Q operated as part of WeWork’s global network of coworking locations.

In March 2020, Managed by Q was acquired by Eden.
