= Christopher Morphew =

American academic administrator

Christopher Clark Morphew

Dean of the Johns Hopkins School of Education
- Incumbent
- Assumed office August 1, 2017
- Preceded by: David W. Andrews

Personal details
- Born: 1967 (age 58–59) Des Moines, Iowa, United States
- Spouse: Tanya (m. 28 May 1994)
- Education: Stanford University (PhD, MA), University of Notre Dame (MEd, BA)
- Alma mater: University of Notre Dame, Harvard University, Stanford University
- Profession: Academic, University administrator

Christopher Clark Morphew (/ˈmɔːrfjuː/; born 1967) is an American academic and the former dean of the Johns Hopkins School of Education, a position he assumed on August 1, 2017. His term as dean ended on June 30, 2026.

He has held leadership positions in the Association for the Study of Higher Education and American Educational Research Association. His work has been published in many journals, such as The Review of Higher Education, Research in Higher Education, The Journal of Higher Education, Educational Finance, Higher Education Policy, and Studies in Higher Education. He has presented his work in more than two dozen countries. His work has been funded by the National Science Foundation, Lumina Foundation, Norges forskningsråd and the Ford Foundation.

== Early life and education ==
Morphew was born in 1967 in Des Moines, Iowa. For the early part of his life he lived in Nemaha, Iowa, before moving to Estherville, Iowa. He graduated from Estherville High School in 1986. He went on to study at the University of Notre Dame near South Bend, Indiana. He graduated from the University of Notre Dame with a BA degree in Government and Philosophy in 1990, followed by a Master of Education degree from the Harvard University Graduate School of Education in 1991. He received a Master of Arts degree in sociology from Stanford University in 1994. He was awarded his PhD in social sciences and educational practices from Stanford University in 1996, with a thesis, "Statewide governing boards and program duplication: a longitudinal system of seven public systems of higher education".

== Career ==
He worked from 1996 to 1997 as a visiting assistant professor for the Higher Education Program at Iowa State University, in Ames, Iowa. He moved to Lawrence, Kansas, in 1997, where he became an assistant professor in the Higher Education Administration Program at the University of Kansas. In 2002, he became an associate professor in the program. From 2004 to 2007, he was on the Faculty for Executive Doctorate in the Higher Education Management Program at the University of Pennsylvania. In 2005, he moved to Athens, Georgia, to teach as an associate professor at the University of Georgia's Institute of Higher Education. From December 2006 until June 2009, he was the graduate program coordinator for the University of Georgia's Institute of Higher Education. Between August 2006 and June 2009, he was co-director of the Franklin Fellows Postdoctoral Teaching Program for the University of Georgia. In 2009, he moved to Iowa City, Iowa, where he was a professor of educational policy and leadership studies at the University of Iowa College of Education for eight years, and departmental executive officer chair of this program from July 2009 to May 2014. For two years, Morphew took sabbatical, working as a visiting professor at the University of Oslo in Oslo, Norway as a Leif Erickson Scholar. From January 2014 to July 2017, he was the executive associate dean for research and innovation at the University of Iowa College of Education. On August 1, 2017, he became the dean of the Johns Hopkins School of Education in Baltimore, Maryland.

In 2022, several former students in the school's Counseling program accused the program of discrimination after their dismissals. In response, Dean Morphew wrote a letter to the JHU News-Letter defending the program and professors named, and asked the News-Letter to retract their article. The situation was covered by Inside Higher Ed in April of 2022.The program had previously lost CACREP accreditation in 2019

== Personal life and family ==
Morphew married his wife, Tanya, on 28 May 1994. Christopher Morphew is the youngest of three children.

== Books ==
- Taylor, B.J. & Morphew, C.C. (2013). Institutional contributions to financing students: trends in general subsidies, 1987–2007. In D.E. Heller & C. Callender (Eds.), Student Financing of Higher Education: A Comparative Perspective. New York: Routledge Press.
- Morphew, C.C. & Swanson, C. (2011). On the efficacy of pursuing university rankings. In J.C. Shin, R.K. Toutkoushian & S. Marginson (Eds.), University Rankings: Theoretical Basis, Methodology and Impacts on Global Higher Education. Dordrecht: Springer.
- Morphew, C.C., & Taylor, B.J. (2010). Markets in the U.S. higher education system: Imperfect competition for undergraduates. In R. Brown (Ed.), Higher Education and the Market (pp. 53–62). New York: Routledge Press.
- Morphew, C.C. & Eckel, P.D. (2009). Assessing privatization objectively and from diverse perspectives. In C.C. Morphew & P.D. Eckel (Eds.), Diverse Perspectives on The Privatization of the Public Research University. Baltimore: Johns Hopkins University Press.
- Eckel, P.D. & Morphew, C.C. (2009). Toward a clearer understanding of privatization. In C.C. Morphew & P.D. Eckel (Eds.), Diverse Perspectives on The Privatization of the Public Research University. Baltimore: Johns Hopkins University Press.
- Eckel, P.D. & Morphew, C.C. (2009). The organizational dynamics of privatization in the public research university: when privatization hits the (garbage) can. In C.C. Morphew & P.D. Eckel (Eds.), Diverse Perspectives on The Privatization of the Public Research University. Baltimore: Johns Hopkins University Press.
- Wolf-Wendel, L.E., Toma, J.D. & Morphew, C.C. (2000). Winning through diversity: lessons from intercollegiate athletics in creating community from difference. In National Association for Student Personnel Administrators (Ed.), Diversity on Campus. Washington, DC: NASPA.
- Morphew, C.C. & Jenniskens, C.G.M. (1999). Assessing institutional change at the level of the faculty: examining faculty motivators and new degree programmes. In B. Jongbloed, P. Maassen & G. Neave (Eds.), From the Eye of the Storm: Higher Education's Changing Institution. Dordrecht, The Netherlands: Kluwer Academic Publishers.
- Morphew, C.C. (1999). Challenges facing shared governance within the college. In J.D. Toma & A. Kezar (Eds.), Reconceptualizing the Collegiate Ideal. New Directions for Higher Education, 105, 71–81. San Francisco: Jossey-Bass.
- Cohen, E.G., Lotan, R.A. & Morphew, C.C. (1998). Beyond the workshop: evidence from complex instruction. In N. Davidson and C. Brody (Eds.), Professional Development and Cooperative Learning: Issues and Approaches. Buffalo, NY: SUNY Press.
- Cohen, E.G., Bianchini, J.A., Cossey, R., Holthuis, N.C., Morphew, C.C. & Whitcomb, J.A. (1997). What did students learn?: 1982–1994. In E.G. Cohen and R.A. Lotan (Eds.), Working for Equity in Heterogeneous Classrooms. New York: Teachers College Press.
- Lotan, R.A., Cohen, E.G. & Morphew, C.C. (1997). Principals, colleagues and staff developers: the case for organizational support. In E.G. Cohen and R.A. Lotan (Eds.), Working for Equity in Heterogeneous Classrooms. New York: Teachers College Press.
- Miller, G.N.S. & Morphew, C.C. (in press). Merchants of optimism: agenda-setting organizations and the framing of performance-based funding in higher education. Journal of Higher Education. Published online May 4, 2017. http://www.tandfonline.com/doi/full/10.1080/00221546.2017.1313084?scroll=top&needAccess=true
- Morphew, C.C., Fumasoli, T. & Stensaker, B. (in press). Changing missions? How the strategic plans of research-intensive universities in Northern Europe and North America balance competing identities. Studies in Higher Education. Published online August 11, 2016. doi:10.1080/03075079.2016.1214697
- Taylor, B.J. & Morphew, C.C. (2017). Phil Knight and the public purposes of higher education. Change, 49, 43–49. Published online May 30, 2017. doi:10.1080/00091383.2017.1286217
- Taylor, B.J. & Morphew, C.C. (2015). Trends in cost-sharing in the United States. Higher Education Policy, 28 (2), 129–149.
- Weerts, D.J., Freed, G. & Morphew, C.C. (2014). Organizational Identity in higher education: conceptual and empirical perspectives. Higher Education: Handbook of Theory and Practice, 29, 229–278. New York: Springer.
- Saichaie, K. & Morphew, C.C. (2014). What college and university websites reveal about the purposes of higher education. Journal of Higher Education, 85(4), 499–530.
- Morphew, C.C. & Taylor, B.J. (2013). What sticker price doesn't mean: Non-profit higher education, expenditures, and general subsidies. Teachers College Record. ID 17355. (Retrieved January 2, 2014 from tcrecord.org/Content.asp?ContentId=17355)
- Taylor, B.J. & Morphew, C.C. (2010). An analysis of baccalaureate college mission statements. Research in Higher Education, 51(5), 483–503.
- Morphew, C.C. (2009). Conceptualizing change in the institutional diversity of U.S. colleges and universities. Journal of Higher Education, 80(3), 243–269.
- Hartley, J.M. & Morphew, C.C. (2008). What's being sold and to what end? A content analysis of college viewbooks. Journal of Higher Education, 79(6), 671–691.
- Morphew, C.C. & Baker, B.D. (2007). On the utility of national datasets and resource cost models to estimate faculty instructional costs in higher education. Journal of Education Finance, 33(1), 20–48.
- Morphew, C.C. (2007). Fixed tuition pricing: a solution that may be worse than the problem. Change, January/February, 34–39.
- Morphew, C.C. & Hartley, M. (2006). Mission statements: a thematic analysis of rhetoric across institutional type. Journal of Higher Education, 77(3), 456–471.
- Morphew, C.C. & Baker, B.D. (2004). The cost of prestige: Do new Research 1 Universities incur increased administrative costs? The Review of Higher Education, 27(3), 365–384.
- Wolf-Wendel, L.E., Twombly, S.B., Morphew, C.C. & Sopcich, J. (2004). From the barrio to the bucolic: The student transfer experience from an HSI to Smith College. Community College Journal of Research and Practice, 28, 1–19.
- Morphew, C.C., Wolf-Wendel, L.E. & Toma, J.D. (2003). A rejoinder to "There's no 'I' in team." The Review of Higher Education, 26(4), 497–501.
- Morphew, C.C. & Huisman, J.A. (2002). Using institutional theory to reframe research on academic drift. Higher Education in Europe, XXVII(4), 491–505.
- Morphew, C.C. (2002). A rose by any other name: which colleges became universities. The Review of Higher Education, 25(2), 207–224.
- Morphew, C.C., Twombly, S.B & Wolf-Wendel, L.E. (2001). Innovative linkages: two urban community colleges and an elite private liberal arts college. Community College Review, 29(3), 1–21.
- Wolf-Wendel, L.E., Toma, J.D. & Morphew, C.C. (2001). How much difference is too much difference? Journal of College Student Development. 42(5), 465–479.
- Wolf-Wendel, L.E., Toma, J.D. & Morphew, C.C. (2001). There's no "I" in team: Lessons from athletics on community building. The Review of Higher Education, 24(4), 369–396.
- Morphew, C.C. (2000). The realities of strategic planning: program termination at East Central University. The Review of Higher Education, 23(3), 257–280.
- Morphew, C.C. (2000). Institutional diversity, program acquisition and faculty members: examining academic drift at a new level. Higher Education Policy, 3, 55–77.
- Wolf-Wendel, L.E., Baker, B.D. & Morphew, C.C. (2000). Dollars and $ense: Institutional resources and the baccalaureate origins of women doctorates. Journal of Higher Education, 71(2), 165–186.
- Huisman, J. & Morphew, C.C. (1998). Centralization and diversity: Evaluating the effects of government policies in US and Dutch higher education. Higher Education Policy, 11(1), 3–13.
- Morphew, C.C. & Williams, A.N. (1998). Using electronic mail to assess undergraduates' experiences. The Journal of Computing in Higher Education, 10(1), 38–55.
- Morphew, C.C., Ward, K. & Wolf-Wendel, L.E. (2016). Changes in faculty composition at independent colleges. A report for the Council of Independent Colleges.
- Morphew, C.C., Ward, K. & Wolf-Wendel, L.E. (2016). Changes in faculty composition at independent colleges. A report for the Council of Independent Colleges.
- Morphew, C.C. (March 9, 2012). Foolish to cut academics to cover deficit in athletics. Op-Ed. Des Moines Register.
- Morphew, C.C. & Taylor, B.J. (August 19, 2009). College rankings and dueling mission statements. The Chronicle of Higher Education.
- Morphew, C.C. (January 18, 2008). Policymakers must recognize higher education's 2-tiered system. The Chronicle of Higher Education, 54(19), A34.
- Morphew, C.C. (2007). [Review of the book The True Genius of America at Risk].
  The Review of Higher Education, 30(2), 211–212.
- Morphew, C.C. (July 7, 2006). State borders are not barriers to the migration of college students. The Chronicle of Higher Education, 52(44), B24-B25.
- Morphew, C.C. (May 2005). Student Migration: Relief Valve for State Enrollment and Demographic Pressures. Paper published as part of the Policy Insights Issued by the Western Interstate Commission for Higher Education, Boulder, Colorado.
- Morphew, C.C. & Holdsworth, J.M. (February 2005). Measuring Up 2004: A National Report Card. A MHEC Perspective. Report issued by the Midwest Higher Education Compact, Minneapolis, Minnesota.
- Morphew, C.C. (July 2003). Surviving and succeeding in the academy: the importance (and challenge) of mentoring. Invited essay for Association for the Study of Higher Education Newsletter.
- Morphew, C.C. (2002). Research universities. In J.W. Guthrie (Ed.), Encyclopedia of Education. New York: MacMillan Reference.
- Morphew, C.C. (2002). Institutional diversity. In J.F. Forest & K. Kinser (Eds.), Higher Education in the United States: An Encyclopedia. Santa Barbara: ABC-CLIO.
- Morphew, C.C. (2002). [Review of the book Market Values in American Higher Education. The Pitfalls and Promises]. Journal of Higher Education, 73(2), 300–302.
- Morphew, C.C. (2000). [Review of the book The Political University: Policy, Politics, and Presidential Leadership in the American Research University]. Journal of Higher Education, 71(1), 112–114.
- Morphew, C.C. (1998). [Review of the book How Organizations Learn]. Management Learning, 31, 131–133.
- Morphew, C.C. & Wolf-Wendel, L.E. (1998). [Review of the book Social Sciences in Actual Practice]. Management Learning, 30, 502–503.
- LeTendre, Gerald K. & Morphew, C. C. (1996). [Review of the book Organizations and Environments]. Management Learning, 27, 495–497.
- Morphew, C.C. & Braxton, J.M. (Eds.). (November 2017). The Challenges of Independent Colleges: Moving Research to Practice. Baltimore: The Johns Hopkins University Press.
- Morphew, C.C. & Eckel, P.D. (Eds.). (2009). Privatizing the Public University: Perspectives from Across the Academy. Baltimore: The Johns Hopkins University Press.
- Tight, M., Morphew, C.C., Huisman, J. & Mok, K.H. (Eds.). (2009). Routledge International Handbook of Higher Education. London, U.K.: Routledge.
