= David W. Andrews =

American academic

David W. Andrews is an American academic, who served as the president of National University from 2016 to 2021, and serves as the chancellor of University of Massachusetts Global (UMass Global). He previously taught at Oregon State University, Ohio State University, and Johns Hopkins University, where he was the dean of the School of Education, having been succeeded by Christopher Morphew on August 1, 2017. Andrews’ areas of teaching specialization include adolescent and youth development, early childhood education, program development and evaluation, and parenting.

== Education ==
David Andrews earned his associate degree at Pensacola Junior College in 1976. Then in 1977, he completed his bachelor's degree in psychology from Auburn University. In 1980 Andrews received his M.S. in child development from Kansas State University. Finally, he graduated with his Ph.D. in child development from Florida State University.

== Career ==
=== Oregon State University ===
Following his PhD, Andrews then taught in the Department of Human Development and Family Studies at Oregon State University from 1983 to 1989, heading that department from 1985 to 1989. He was also the co-investigator on National Institute of Mental Health and National Institute on Drug Abuse adolescent drug-abuse prevention projects as a research scientist for the Oregon Social Learning Center from 1989 to 1995. During that time, he also served as an adjunct associate professor at the University of Oregon’s Department of Psychology.

=== Ohio State University ===
Following his career at Oregon, Andrews began working at Ohio State University as an associate professor and Extension State Specialist in the college's Department of Family Relations and Human Development in 1995. He became the director at the Center for Learning Excellence and later merged two previously independent colleges into the College of Education and Human Ecology, becoming the founding dean of that college. During his tenure as dean he led the effort to build the Schoenbaum Family Center.

=== Johns Hopkins University ===
In 2010 Andrews relocated to Johns Hopkins University, where he served as a professor and as dean at the School of Education until 2016. While serving as dean, the faculty earned a No. 1 ranking by U.S. News & World Report. At Johns Hopkins, Dr. Andrews is credited with launching an online education program that served 60 percent of students enrolled in the university's School of Education by the time he left in 2016. He also led the design, construction, and operation of the Henderson-Hopkins School and the Weinberg Early Childhood Center in the East Baltimore Development Inc.

=== National University ===
David Andrews was named President of National University effective April 1, 2016, and resigned effective July 1, 2021. He is also one of the founders of Deans for Impact.

=== UMass Global ===
The UMass Global Board of Regents appointed Andrews to the position of chancellor at the conclusion of a national search for a successor to Gary Brahm, the university's founding chancellor. The university announced Andrews' appointment on June 30, 2022.

== Publications ==
David Andrews has written research articles, book chapters, and abstracts on topics that include addictive behaviors, the impacts that parenting has on college freshmen, family involvement in juvenile diversion, adolescent development, preventative interventions for high-risk youth, and educational reform. His first fiction, My Father’s Day Gift, was originally published in 2014.
