= Morphew =

Morphew is a surname. Notable people with the surname include:

- Christopher Morphew (born 1967), American academic
- John Morphew (died 1720), English publisher
- Margaret Morphew (1916–1987), South African tennis player
- Melissa Morphew (born 1963), American poet

== See also ==
- Queen of Hearts (musician), English musician; born Elizabeth Morphew
