= Saul Brandman =

American businessman and philanthropist

- Born: August 25, 1925; Brooklyn, New York, US
- Died: May 27, 2008 (aged 82)
- Education: B.S. UCLA
- Occupation: Garment manufacturer
- Spouse: Joyce O'Donnell
- Children: 3

Saul Brandman (August 25, 1925 – May 27, 2008) was an American businessman and philanthropist.

== Biography ==
Brandman was born to a Jewish family on August 25, 1925, in Brooklyn, New York, the son of Morris and Manya Brandman. He had one brother, Morrie. He was raised in the Boyle Heights neighborhood of Los Angeles and worked as a youth at his father's downtown haberdashery. Brandman graduated from Fairfax High School and UCLA with a B.S. in pre-med. During World War II, he served as a First Class Corpsman in the United States Navy. After the war, he moved to Los Angeles where he started a clothing manufacturing company with his partner, Steve Gordon. Together, they created a succession of companies and brands including Timely Trends (a junior-related separates, dress and private label manufacturer), Tomboy of California, Jefferson Trading, and the real estate investment and development company Domino Realty Management of California where he served as CEO until his death.

== Philanthropy ==
In 1973, Saul established the Saul Brandman Foundation which later became the Joyce and Saul Brandman Foundation in 1993. The foundation was responsible for funding The Saul and Joyce Brandman Breast Center at Cedars Sinai Medical Center (Joyce was diagnosed with breast cancer in 1999); Samuel Oschin Comprehensive Cancer Institute; the International Hearing and Seeing Eye Dogs; the Brandman Geriatric Research Institute and the Brandman Center for Senior Care both at the Los Angeles Jewish Home for the Aging; and endowed the Chair in Pulmonary Arterial Hypertension at the David Geffen School of Medicine at UCLA. In 2008, Brandman received the Mitchell Family Foundation Philanthropy Award for the Jewish Free Loan Association. After his death, his wife continued his philanthropic activities including a substantial contribution to Chapman University College (which offers online and in-person classes geared toward non-traditional students including mid-career students, military personnel, and those who cannot afford college) which was renamed Brandman University in 2009; and a $8 million gift to Hebrew University in 2010.

== Personal life ==
Brandman married three times. He has three children with his first wife: Michael Brandman, Sonya Brandman, and Maureen Brandman. In 1993, he married his third wife, Joyce O'Donnell, after 25 years of dating. Brandman died of heart disease on May 27, 2008; he was buried at Hillside Memorial Park in Los Angeles.
