= The Review of Higher Education =

- Discipline: Education
- Language: English

Publication details
- History: 1978-present
- Publisher: Johns Hopkins University Press (United States)
- Frequency: Quarterly

Standard abbreviations
- ISO 4: Rev. High. Educ.

Indexing
- ISSN: 0162-5748 (print); 1090-7009 (web)
- OCLC no.: 35451211

Links
- Journal homepage; Online access

The Review of Higher Education is an academic journal founded in 1978 and the official journal of the Association for the Study of Higher Education. The publication is aimed at scholars, educators, and policymakers and includes articles, essays, reviews, and research intended to better inform readers of the issues that affect higher education today.

The journal is published quarterly in September, December, March, and June by the Johns Hopkins University Press. Circulation is 2,058 and the average length of an issue is 104 pages.

== See also ==
- Post-secondary education
