= University of Massachusetts Global =

Private online university in California, U.S.

Coordinates: 33.582771°N 117.727764°W

- Former names: Brandman University; Chapman University College; Chapman College; College of Lifelong Learning
- Type: Private online university
- Established: 1958; 68 years ago (as Chapman University College)
- Chancellor: David W. Andrews
- Provost: Jeremy Korr
- Faculty: 828 (full-time and part-time) (as of 2023–2024)
- Administrative staff: 461 (as of 2023–2024)
- Students: Approximately 19,000 annually (as of fall 2024)
- Undergraduates: 7,819 (as of 2023–2024)
- Postgraduates: 6,278 (as of 2023–2024)
- Location: Aliso Viejo, California, United States
- Campus: Online
- Colors: Blue & Red
- Website: www.umassglobal.edu

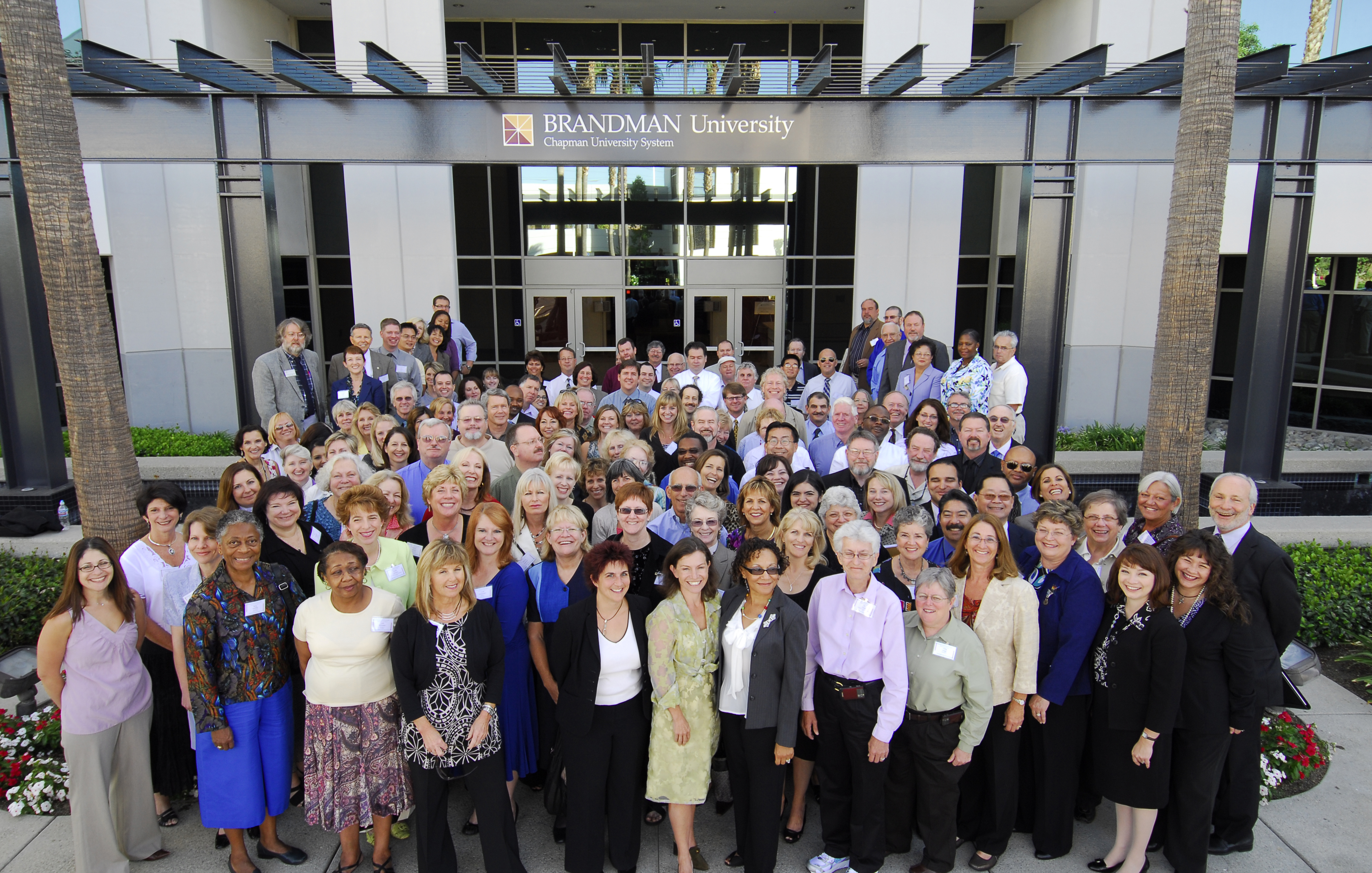
Brandman Faculty and Staff, Irvine, CA

University of Massachusetts Global (UMass Global, formerly Brandman University) is a private online university headquartered in Aliso Viejo, California. The university offers more than 55 degree, certificate, credential, and professional programs for working adults. Brandman was a separate, regionally-accredited university within the Chapman University system. In September 2021, Brandman separated from the Chapman University system, and formed a new affiliation with the University of Massachusetts, UMass Global. UMass Global is accredited by the WASC Senior College and University Commission.

== History ==
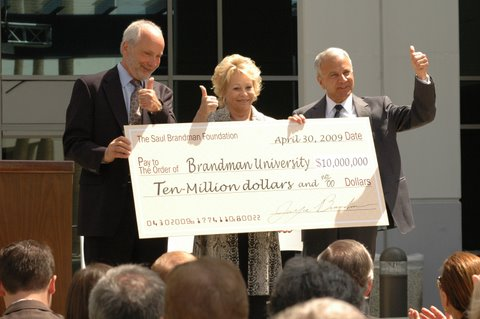
Chancellor Brahm, Joyce Brandman and Former Chapman University President Jim Doti.

=== Chapman University ===
The institutional history of UMass Global history began in 1958, when faculty from then-Chapman College first delivered on-base classes at Marine Corps Air Station El Toro in Orange County, California. After expanding education services to additional military facilities, Chapman formed a Division of Residence Education Centers to manage its operations. The centers evolved into the College of Lifelong Learning, which became Chapman University College in 2001. Chapman University College was incorporated in 2008. In 2009, the university was renamed Brandman University after a substantial donation from the Joyce and Saul Brandman Foundation.

=== University of Massachusetts ===
In September 2021, Brandman affiliated with the University of Massachusetts (UMass) via a change of control agreement and rebranded as UMass Global. The development followed UMass' announcement two years prior that it would launch an online affiliate. The arrangement calls for Chapman to receive $96 million from UMass Global, with disbursements to be made over a 10-year term. UMass Global has also agreed to buy its Irvine, California, campus for $37 million. There will be leadership and oversight overlap between the UMass Board of Trustees and that of UMass Global.

While the Brandman name was still in use, Military Times ranked the university as one of the nation’s "Best for Vets" for 2021.

As of September 2021, UMass Global had 23,000 students online and in person, with the majority being on the West Coast. For the academic year 2022–2023, UMass Global had approximately 19,000 students with over 13,000 enrolled in courses for academic credit and nearly 5,500 enrolled in non-credit extended education courses.

== Academics ==
The university offers degree programs through four schools: School of Education; School of Business and Professional Studies; School of Arts and Sciences; and School of Extended Education.

UMass Global uses a curriculum model known as iDEAL (Instructional Design for Engaged Adult Learning) and all of its faculty positions are non-tenured.

The university is accredited by the WASC Senior College and University Commission and is a member of the Council for Adult and Experiential Learning (CAEL). Teacher training programs offered through the School of Education are accredited by the California Commission on Teacher Credentialing (CCTC). The undergraduate social work program is accredited by Council on Social Work Education (CSWE).
