= Association for the Study of Higher Education =

American scholarly organization

- Website: www.ashe.ws

Founded in 1976, the Association for the Study of Higher Education (ASHE) is a national organization of scholars dedicated to higher education as a field of study (comprising leadership theory and organizational theory). Relevant journals include the American Educational Research Journal and Studies in Higher Education and Research in Higher Education.

Many colleges and universities offer Ph.D. and Ed.D. programs in higher education administration and leadership, including Eastern Michigan University.
