= Johns Hopkins University =

Private university in Baltimore, Maryland, U.S.

- Latin: Universitas Hopkinsiensis
- Motto: Veritas vos liberabit (Latin)
- Motto in English: "The truth will set you free"
- Type: Private research university
- Established: February 22, 1876; 150 years ago
- Accreditation: MSCHE
- Academic affiliations: AAU; COFHE; CUWMA; NAICU; ORAU; UARC; URA; Space-grant
- Endowment: US$19.1 billion (FY2026)
- President: Ronald J. Daniels
- Provost: Lainie Rutkow (interim)
- Total staff: 27,300
- Students: 30,210 (fall 2024)
- Undergraduates: 6,356 (fall 2024)
- Postgraduates: 23,854 (fall 2024)
- Location: Baltimore, Maryland, United States; 39°19′44″N 76°37′13″W
- Campus: 140 acres (57 ha); Large city
- Other campuses: Laurel; Washington, D.C.; Bologna; Nanjing
- Newspaper: The Johns Hopkins News-Letter
- Colors: Heritage blue and spirit blue
- Nickname: Blue Jays
- Sporting affiliations: NCAA Division III - Centennial; Big Ten; MAWPC
- Mascot: Blue Jay
- Website: jhu.edu

Johns Hopkins University (JHU), often abbreviated as Hopkins, is a private research university in Baltimore, Maryland, United States. Incorporated in 1867 and opened in 1876 based on the European research institution model, Johns Hopkins is considered to be the first research university in the U.S.

The university was named for its first benefactor, the American businessman and Quaker philanthropist Johns Hopkins. Hopkins's $7 million bequest (equivalent to $166 million in 2024) to establish the university and the affiliated Johns Hopkins Hospital in Baltimore was the largest philanthropic gift in U.S. history up to that time. Daniel Coit Gilman, who was inaugurated as Johns Hopkins's first president on February 22, 1876, led the university to revolutionize higher education in the U.S. by integrating teaching and research. In 1900, Johns Hopkins became a founding member of the Association of American Universities. The School of Medicine, established in 1893, has achieved international recognition for its pioneering biomedical research.

The university consists of ten academic divisions mostly divided among four campuses in Baltimore, with some graduate campuses in Italy, China, and Washington, D.C. The university's two undergraduate divisions, the Zanvyl Krieger School of Arts and Sciences and the Whiting School of Engineering, are located on the Homewood campus adjacent to Baltimore's Charles Village neighborhood. The School of Medicine, School of Nursing, and Bloomberg School of Public Health are located on the medical campus in East Baltimore, alongside Johns Hopkins Hospital. The university also consists of the Peabody Institute in Baltimore's Mount Vernon neighborhood, Applied Physics Laboratory in Howard County, School of Advanced International Studies, School of Education, and Carey Business School.

Founded in 1883, the Johns Hopkins Blue Jays men's lacrosse team, which is an affiliate member in the Big Ten Conference, has won 44 national titles. The university's other sports teams compete in Division III of the NCAA, where they are members of the Centennial Conference.

== History ==
=== Philanthropic beginnings and foundation ===
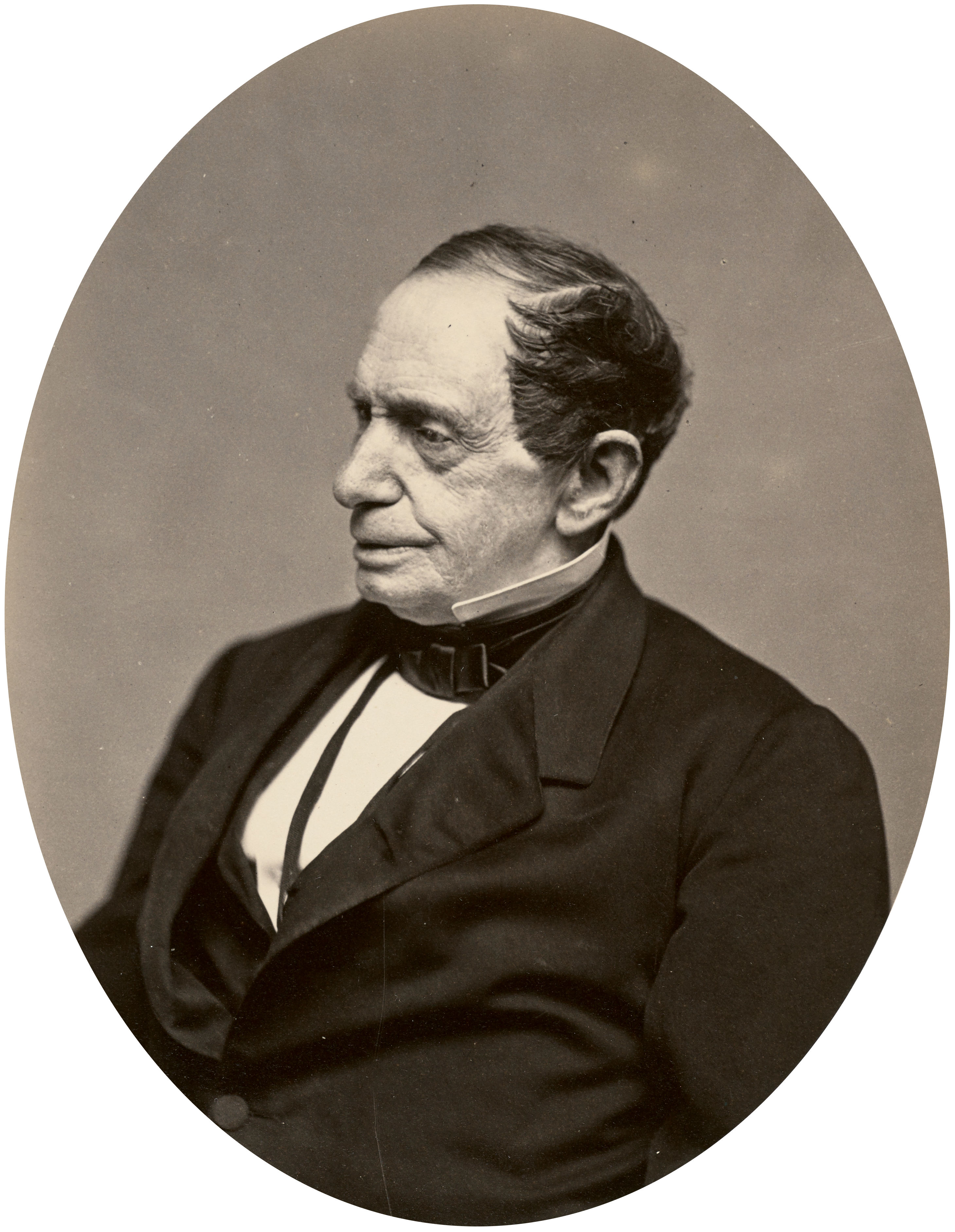
Johns Hopkins, the university's namesake whose philanthropic gift in 1873 established the university, Johns Hopkins Hospital, and the Johns Hopkins School of Medicine

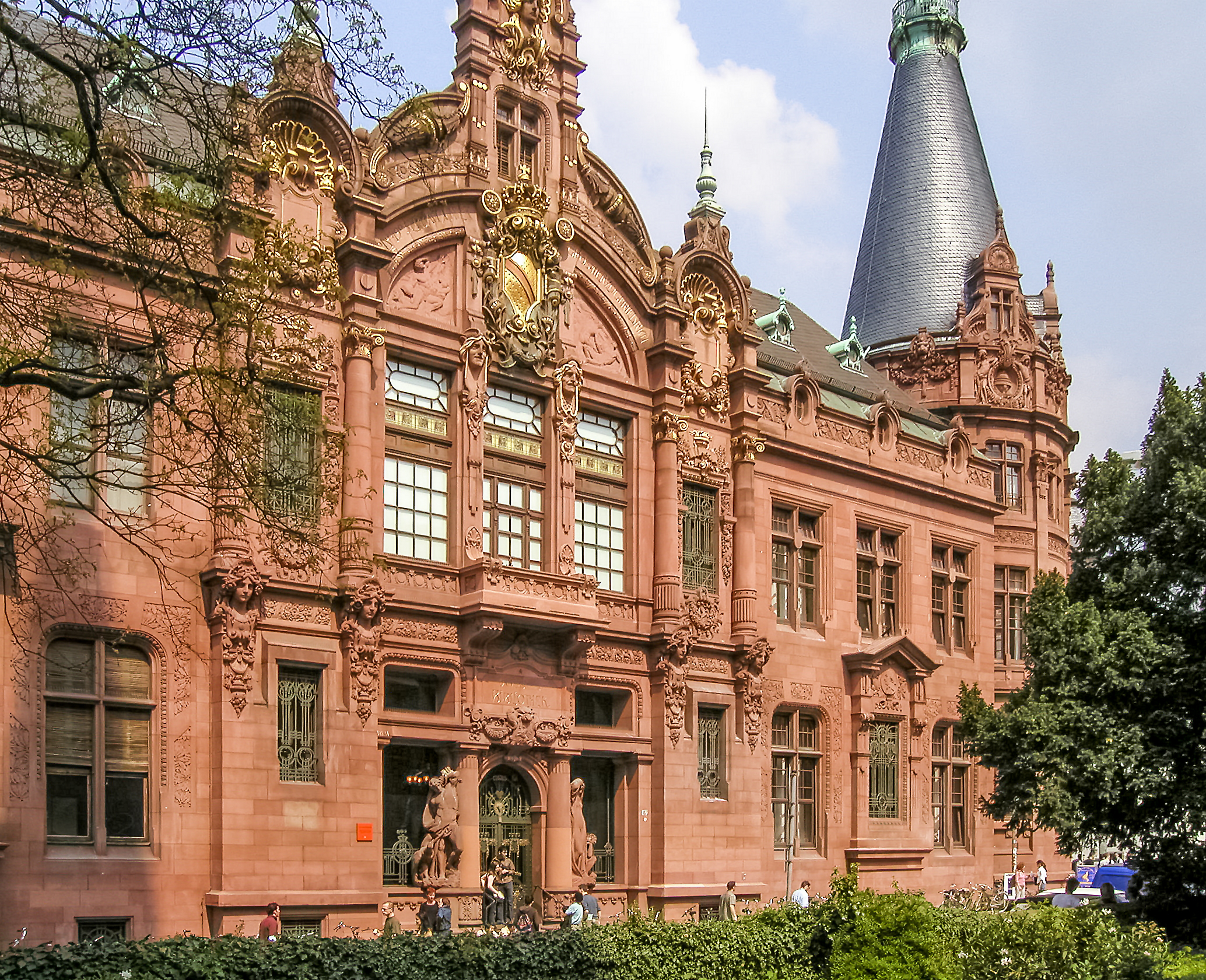
The university model of Heidelberg University in Heidelberg, Germany, was replicated in the founding of Johns Hopkins University

On his death in 1873, Johns Hopkins, a Quaker businessman and childless bachelor, bequeathed $7 million (equivalent to $166 million in 2024) to fund a hospital and university in Baltimore.

At the time, this donation, generated primarily from the Baltimore and Ohio Railroad, was the largest philanthropic gift in the history of the United States, and endowment was then the largest in America.

Hopkins’s relationship to slavery has been the subject of historical debate. In 2020, research commissioned by the university, and led by historian Martha S. Jones, cited 1840 and 1850 census records as evidence that individuals recorded as enslaved were his property and associated with his household. Subsequent scholarship has questioned this interpretation, noting the limitations of census data, particularly the ambiguity of the 1850 slave schedule, and the absence of corroborating documentation such as tax or probate records linking Hopkins directly to slaveholding.

The first name of philanthropist Johns Hopkins comes from the surname of his great-grandmother, Margaret Johns, who married Gerard Hopkins. They named last their son Johns Hopkins, who named his son Samuel Hopkins. Samuel named one of his sons for his father, and that son became the university's benefactor. Milton Eisenhower, a former university president, once spoke at a convention in Pittsburgh where the master of ceremonies introduced him as "President of John Hopkins". Eisenhower retorted that he was "glad to be here in Pittburgh".

The original board opted for an entirely novel university model dedicated to the discovery of knowledge at an advanced level, extending that of contemporary Germany. Building on the Humboldtian model of higher education, the German education model of Wilhelm von Humboldt, it became dedicated to research. It was especially Heidelberg University and its long academic research history on which the new institution tried to model itself. Johns Hopkins thereby became the model of the modern research university in the United States. Its success eventually shifted higher education in the United States from a focus on teaching revealed and/or applied knowledge to the scientific discovery of new knowledge.

=== 19th century ===
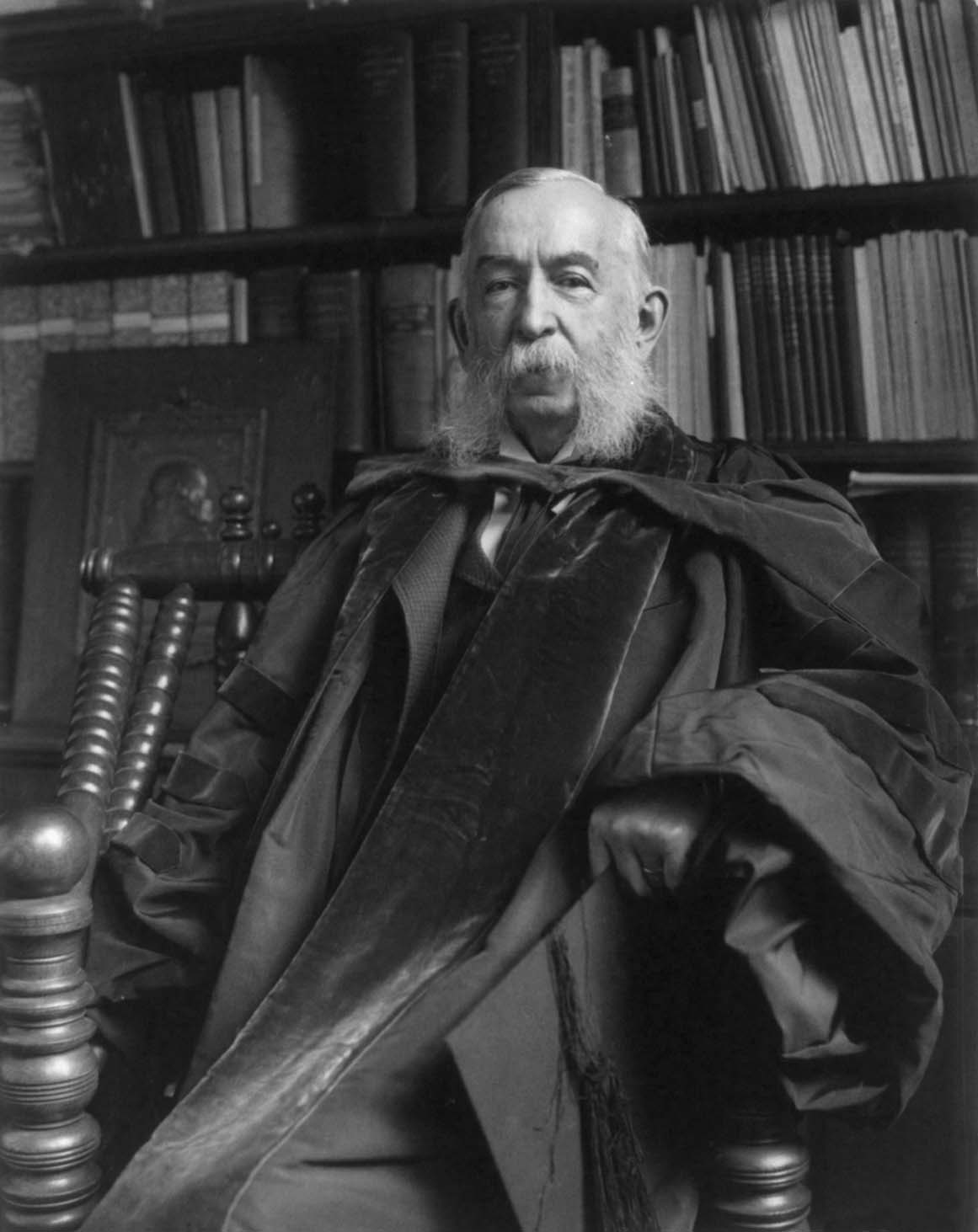
Daniel Coit Gilman, the first president of Johns Hopkins University

The trustees worked alongside four notable university presidents, Charles William Eliot of Harvard University, Andrew D. White of Cornell University, Noah Porter of Yale College, and James B. Angell of University of Michigan. They each supported Daniel Coit Gilman to lead the new university and he became the university's first president. Gilman, a Yale-educated scholar, had been serving as president of the University of California, Berkeley prior to this appointment. In preparation for the university's founding, Daniel Coit Gilman visited University of Freiburg and other German universities.

Gilman launched what many at the time considered an audacious and unprecedented academic experiment to merge teaching and research. He dismissed the idea that the two were mutually exclusive: "The best teachers are usually those who are free, competent and willing to make original researches in the library and the laboratory," he stated.

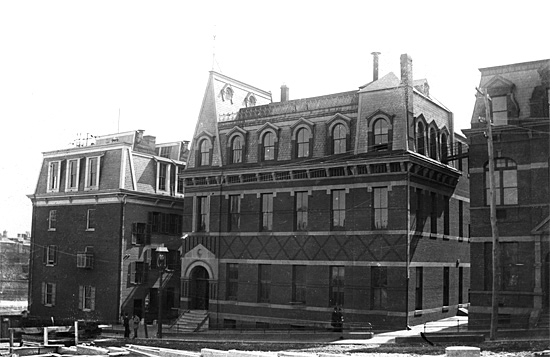
Hopkins Hall on the original Downtown Baltimore campus, c. 1885

To implement his plan, Gilman recruited internationally known researchers including the mathematician James Joseph Sylvester; the biologist H. Newell Martin; the physicist Henry Augustus Rowland, the first president of the American Physical Society, the classical scholars Basil Gildersleeve, and Charles D. Morris; the economist Richard T. Ely; and the chemist Ira Remsen, who became the second president of the university in 1901.

Gilman focused on the expansion of graduate education and support of faculty research. The new university fused advanced scholarship with such professional schools as medicine and engineering. Hopkins became the national trendsetter in doctoral programs and the host for numerous scholarly journals and associations. The Johns Hopkins University Press, founded in 1878, is the oldest American university press in continuous operation.

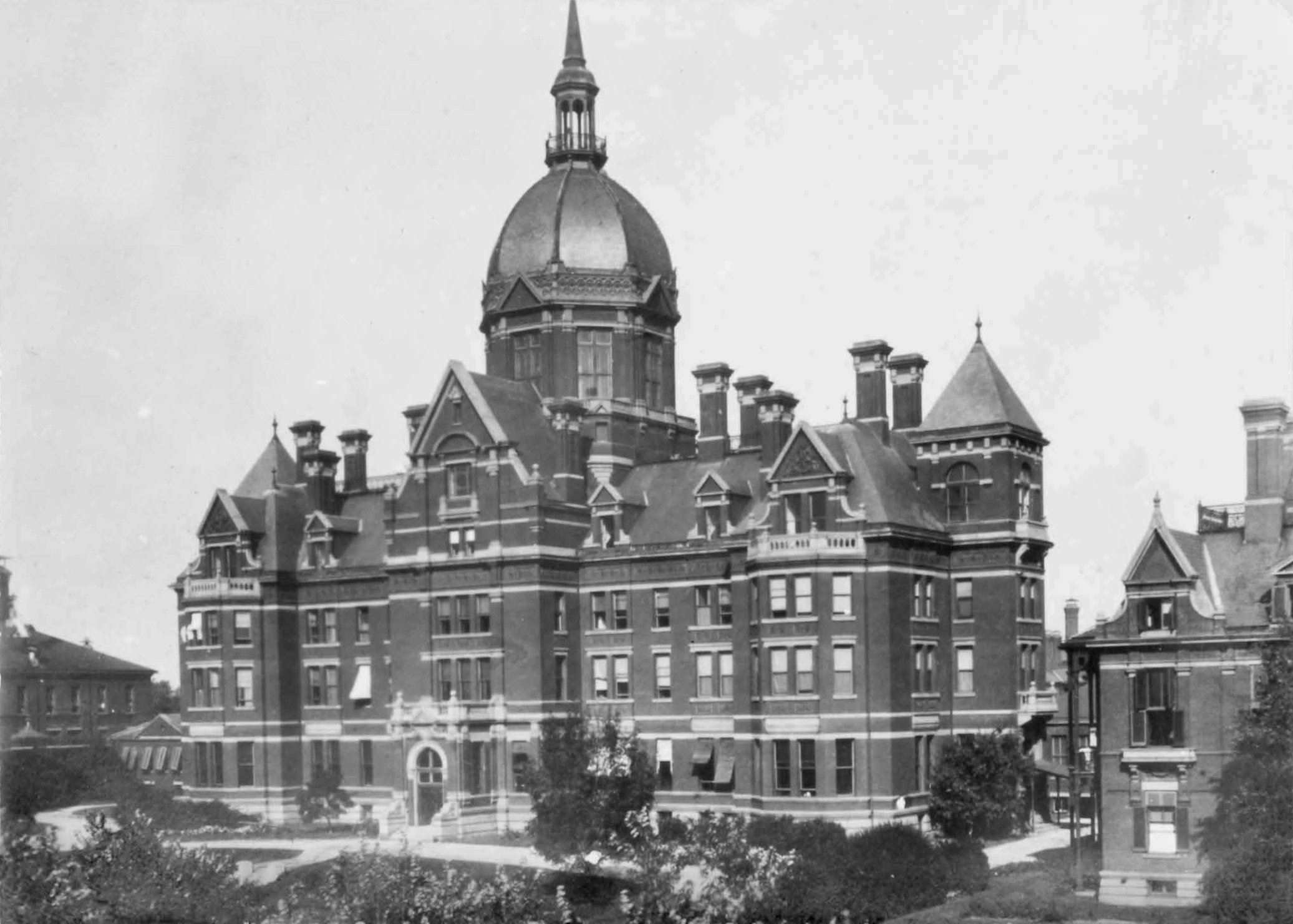
Johns Hopkins Hospital, c. 1880s–1890s

With the completion of Johns Hopkins Hospital in 1889 and the medical school in 1893, the university's research-focused mode of instruction soon began attracting world-renowned faculty members who would become major figures in the emerging field of academic medicine, including William Osler, William Halsted, Howard Kelly, and William Welch. During this period the university further made history by becoming the first medical school to admit women on an equal basis with men and to require a bachelor's degree, based on the efforts of Mary E. Garrett, who had endowed the school at Gilman's request. The school of medicine was America's first coeducational, graduate-level medical school, and became a prototype for academic medicine that emphasized bedside learning, research projects, and laboratory training.

In his will and in his instructions to the trustees of the university and the hospital, Hopkins requested that both institutions be built upon the vast grounds of his Baltimore estate, Clifton. When Gilman assumed the presidency, he decided that it would be best to use the university's endowment for recruiting faculty and students, deciding to, as it has been paraphrased, "build men, not buildings." In his will Hopkins stipulated that none of his endowment should be used for construction; only interest on the principal could be used for this purpose. Unfortunately, stocks in The Baltimore and Ohio Railroad, which would have generated most of the interest, became virtually worthless soon after Hopkins's death. The university's first home was thus in Downtown Baltimore, delaying plans to site the university in Clifton.

=== 20th century ===
In the early 20th century, the university outgrew its buildings and the trustees began to search for a new home. Developing Clifton for the university was too costly, and 30 acres (12 ha) of the estate had to be sold to the city as public park. A solution was achieved by a team of prominent locals who acquired the estate in north Baltimore known as the Homewood Estate. On February 22, 1902, this land was formally transferred to the university. The flagship building, Gilman Hall, was completed in 1915. The School of Engineering relocated in fall of 1914 and the Zanvyl Krieger School of Arts and Sciences followed in 1916. These decades saw the ceding of lands by the university for the public Wyman Park and Wyman Park Dell and the Baltimore Museum of Art, coalescing in the contemporary area of 140 acres (57 ha).

Prior to becoming the main Johns Hopkins campus, the Homewood estate had initially been the gift of Charles Carroll of Carrollton, Maryland, a planter and signer of the Declaration of Independence, to his son Charles Carroll Jr. The original structure, the 1801 Homewood House, still stands and serves as an on-campus museum. The brick and marble Federal style of Homewood House became the architectural inspiration for much of the university campus versus the Collegiate Gothic style of other historic American universities.

In 1909, the university was among the first to start adult continuing education programs and in 1916 it founded the nation's first school of public health.

Since the 1910s, Johns Hopkins University has famously been a "fertile cradle" to Arthur Lovejoy's history of ideas.

Since 1942, the Johns Hopkins Applied Physics Laboratory (APL) has served as a major governmental defense contractor. In tandem with on-campus research, Johns Hopkins has every year since 1979 had the highest federal research funding of any American university.

Professional schools of international affairs and music were established in 1950 and 1977, respectively, when the School of Advanced International Studies in Washington, D.C., and the Peabody Institute in Baltimore were incorporated into the university.

=== 21st century ===
The early decades of the 21st century saw expansion across the university's institutions in both physical and population sizes. Notably, a planned 88-acre expansion to the medical campus began in 2013. Completed construction on the Homewood campus has included a new biomedical engineering building in the Johns Hopkins University Department of Biomedical Engineering, a new library, a new biology wing, an extensive renovation of the flagship Gilman Hall, and the reconstruction of the main university entrance.

These years also brought about the rapid development of the university's professional schools of education and business. From 1999 until 2007, these disciplines had been joined within the School of Professional Studies in Business and Education (SPSBE), itself a reshuffling of several earlier ventures. The 2007 split, combined with new funding and leadership initiatives, has led to the simultaneous emergence of the Johns Hopkins School of Education and the Carey Business School.

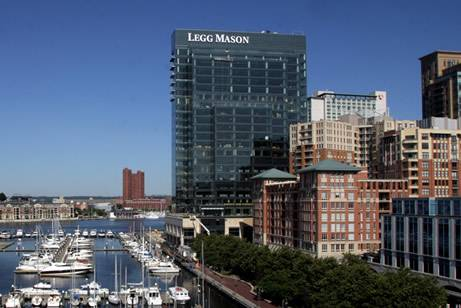
Legg Mason Tower, home of the new Carey Business School

On November 18, 2018, it was announced that Michael Bloomberg would make a donation to his alma mater of $1.8 billion, marking the largest private donation in modern history to an institution of higher education and bringing Bloomberg's total contribution to the school in excess of $3.3 billion. Bloomberg's $1.8 billion gift allows the school to practice need-blind admission and meet the full financial need of admitted students.

In January 2019, the university announced an agreement to purchase the Newseum, located at 555 Pennsylvania Ave. NW, in the heart of Washington, D.C., with plans to locate all of its Washington, D.C.–based graduate programs there. In an interview with The Atlantic, the president of Johns Hopkins stated that, "the purchase is an opportunity to position the university, literally, to better contribute its expertise to national- and international-policy discussions."

In late 2019, the university's Coronavirus Research Center began tracking worldwide cases of the COVID-19 pandemic by compiling data from hundreds of sources around the world. This led to the university becoming one of the most cited sources for data about the pandemic.

In November 2025, following the $1.8 billion gift from alumnus Michael Bloomberg in 2018, the university announced tuition-free plans, for current students in the spring 2026 semester and for new enrollees in the 2026-27 year who were from families earning less than $200,000, in support of making education available to all students based on merit and not means, and citing U.S. Census data showing that around 85% of American households would be eligible. For students from families earning under $100,000, additional aid would cover tuition, fees and living expenses, thus requiring no support from their families.

==== Johns Hopkins Police Department ====
In 2019, Johns Hopkins sought and received permission from the Maryland General Assembly to create a private police force to patrol in and around the three Baltimore campuses. The proposal generated opposition from students, faculty, and surrounding community associations. A resolution expressing concerns and raising questions about accountability and oversight of the proposed police department was unanimously passed by the Homewood Faculty Assembly. Protests culminated in a month-long sit-in and building occupation at Garland Hall, the university's administrative building, which ended after Baltimore Police surrounded the building and arrested the participants in May 2019.

Following the murder of George Floyd in 2020, thousands of faculty, staff, students, and community members petitioned the university to reconsider the department. In June 2020, university president Ronald J. Daniels announced a pause of at least two years in the development and implementation of the department.

As part of the agreement with the university on authorizing the police force, the Maryland General Assembly required the creation of a civilian accountability board and a memorandum of understanding (MOU) with the Baltimore Police Department. A draft MOU was released for public comment in September 2022 amidst continued protest and criticism regarding the university's engagement with the community. The finalized MOU, issued in December 2022, grants the Johns Hopkins Police Department primary jurisdiction over university-controlled property and adjacent public areas. Officer recruitment and training began in spring 2024, with active patrols commencing in summer 2024.

==== Second Trump Administration ====
Beginning in January 2025, federal funding cuts by the Trump administration's Department of Government Efficiency targeting the U.S. Agency for International Development (USAID) caused Johns Hopkins to lose $800 million in grants and forced the university to lay off thousands of employees and cancel research projects. In September, the university reported a total decline in research grants awarded by the National Institutes of Health (NIH) by approximately 40% compared to the previous year and the termination of more than 80 existing grants, reducing the value of the university's research portfolio by $500 million. In response to these challenges, the university imposed a hiring freeze on new staff members, limited discretionary spending, and indefinitely paused wage increases for employees. After the Trump administration announced it would impose a cap of 15% on indirect or "overhead" research costs, which would reduce the university's research funding by $300 million annually, Johns Hopkins joined 40 other universities in a successful lawsuit seeking to reverse the change.

In February 2025, Leo Terrell, the head of the Trump administration's Task Force to Combat Antisemitism, announced that he would investigate Johns Hopkins University as part of the Department of Justice's broader investigation into antisemitism on college campuses. In July 2025, America First Legal founder, the Trump adviser and white nationalist Stephen Miller, requested that the assistant attorney general Harmeet K Dhillon and the justice department investigate "illegal" diversity, equity, and inclusion practices and "a discriminatory DEI regime as a core institutional mandate" in the university.

=== Civil rights ===
==== African-Americans ====
Hopkins was a prominent abolitionist who supported Abraham Lincoln during the American Civil War. After his death, reports said his conviction and Quaker beliefs were decisive factors in enrolling Hopkins's first African-American student, Kelly Miller, a graduate student in physics, astronomy and mathematics. As time passed, the university adopted a "separate but equal" stance more like other Baltimore institutions.

The first black undergraduate entered the school in 1945 and graduate students followed in 1967. James Nabwangu, a British-trained Kenyan, was the first black graduate of the medical school. African-American instructor and laboratory supervisor Vivien Thomas was instrumental in developing and conducting the first successful blue baby operation in 1944. Despite such cases, racial diversity did not become commonplace at Johns Hopkins institutions until the 1960s and 1970s.

==== Women ====
Hopkins's most well-known battle for women's rights was the one led by daughters of trustees of the university; Mary E. Garrett, M. Carey Thomas, Mamie Gwinn, Elizabeth King, and Julia Rogers. They donated and raised the funds needed to open the medical school, and required Hopkins's officials to agree to their stipulation that women would be admitted. The nursing school opened in 1889 and accepted women and men as students. Other graduate schools were later opened to women by president Ira Remsen in 1907. Christine Ladd-Franklin was the first woman to earn a PhD at Hopkins, in mathematics in 1882. The trustees denied her the degree for decades and refused to change the policy about admitting women. In 1893, Florence Bascomb became the university's first female PhD. The decision to admit women at undergraduate level was not considered until the late 1960s and was eventually adopted in October 1969. As of 2009–2010, the undergraduate population was 47% female and 53% male. In 2020, the undergraduate population of Hopkins was 53% female.

==== Freedom of speech ====
On September 5, 2013, cryptographer and Johns Hopkins university professor Matthew Green posted a blog entitled, "On the NSA", in which he contributed to the ongoing debate regarding the role of NIST and NSA in formulating U.S. cryptography standards. On September 9, 2013, Green received a take-down request for the "On the NSA" blog from interim Dean Andrew Douglas from the Johns Hopkins University Whiting School of Engineering. The request cited concerns that the blog had links to sensitive material. The blog linked to already published news articles from The Guardian, The New York Times, and ProPublica.org. Douglas subsequently issued a personal on-line apology to Green. The event raised concern over the future of academic freedom of speech within the cryptologic research community.

== Campuses and divisions ==
Main campuses & divisions
Homewood			East Baltimore (Medical Institutions Campus)			Downtown Baltimore		Washington D.C.	Laurel, Maryland
School of Arts and Sciences; 1876	School of Education; 1909	School of Engineering; 1913	School of Nursing; 1889	School of Medicine; 1893	School of Public Health; 1916	Peabody Institute; 1857	School of Business; 2007	School of Advanced International Studies; 1943	Applied Physics Laboratory; 1942

=== Homewood ===
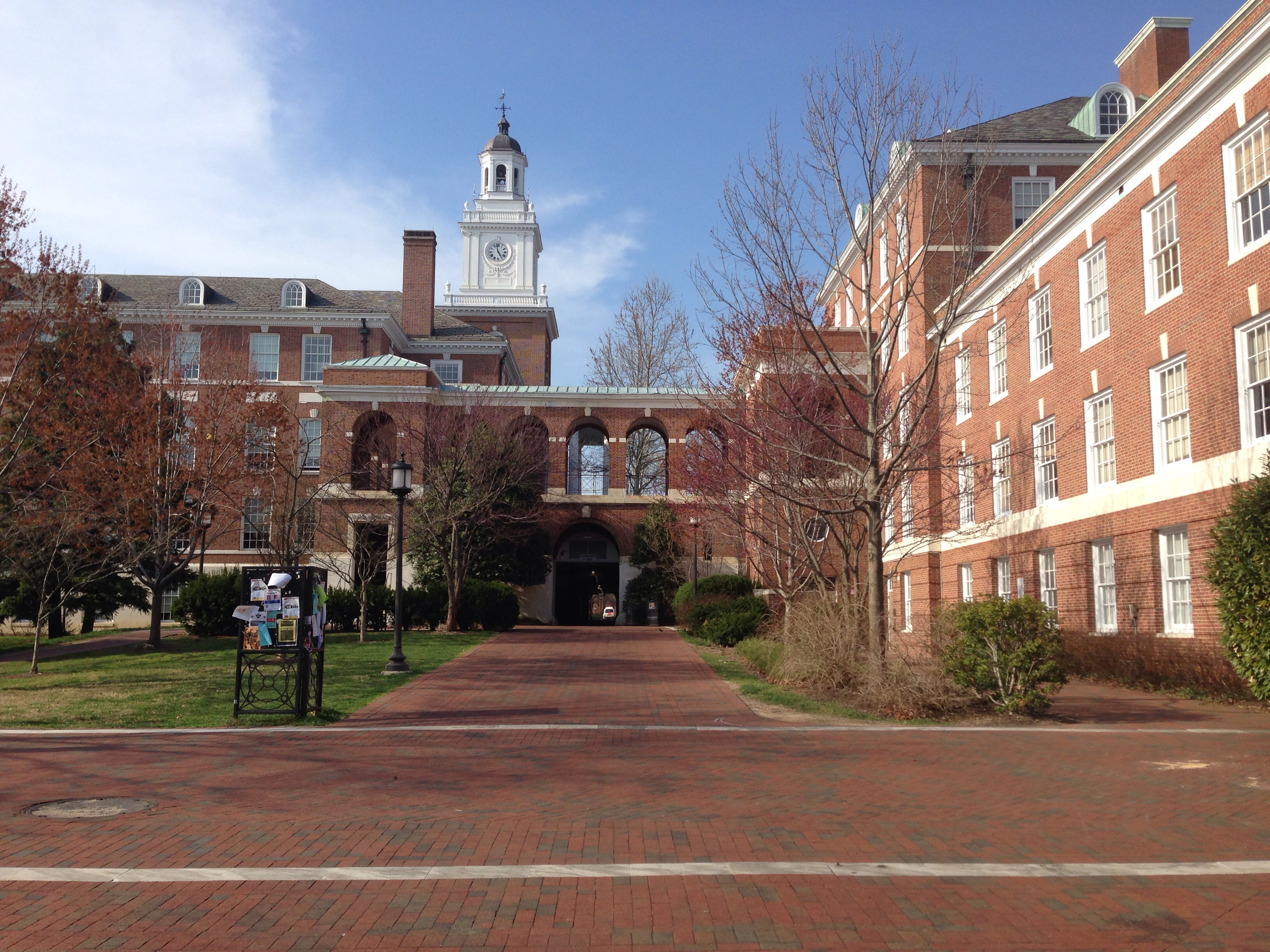
View of Gilman Hall from the Levering Plaza on the Homewood Campus

For its first two decades of existence, university was based in Downtown Baltimore. In the early 20th century, the trustees acquired the Homewood estate of Charles Carroll, son of Charles Carroll of Carollton, a signer of the Declaration of Independence. Carroll's Homewood House is considered one of the finest examples of Federal architecture, which most of the university's buildings are modeled after. Most undergraduate programs are on the Homewood Campus.

- Whiting School of Engineering: The Whiting School contains 14 undergraduate and graduate engineering programs and 12 additional areas of study.
- Zanvyl Krieger School of Arts and Sciences: The Krieger School offers more than 60 undergraduate majors and minors and more than 40 graduate programs.

The School of Education has a building at the southern edge of the Homewood Campus, adjacent to Wyman Park Dell.

=== East Baltimore ===
The Johns Hopkins Hospital, located in the university's medical campus in East Baltimore

Collectively known as Johns Hopkins Medical Institutions (JHMI) campus, the East Baltimore facility occupies several city blocks spreading from the Johns Hopkins Hospital trademark dome.

- Johns Hopkins Bloomberg School of Public Health: The Bloomberg School was founded in 1916 and is the world's oldest and largest school of public health. It has consistently been ranked first in its field by U.S. News & World Report.
- School of Medicine: The School of Medicine is widely regarded as one of the best medical schools and biomedical research institutes in the world.
- School of Nursing: The School of Nursing is one of America's oldest and pre-eminent schools for nursing education. It has consistently ranked first in the nation.

=== Mount Vernon ===
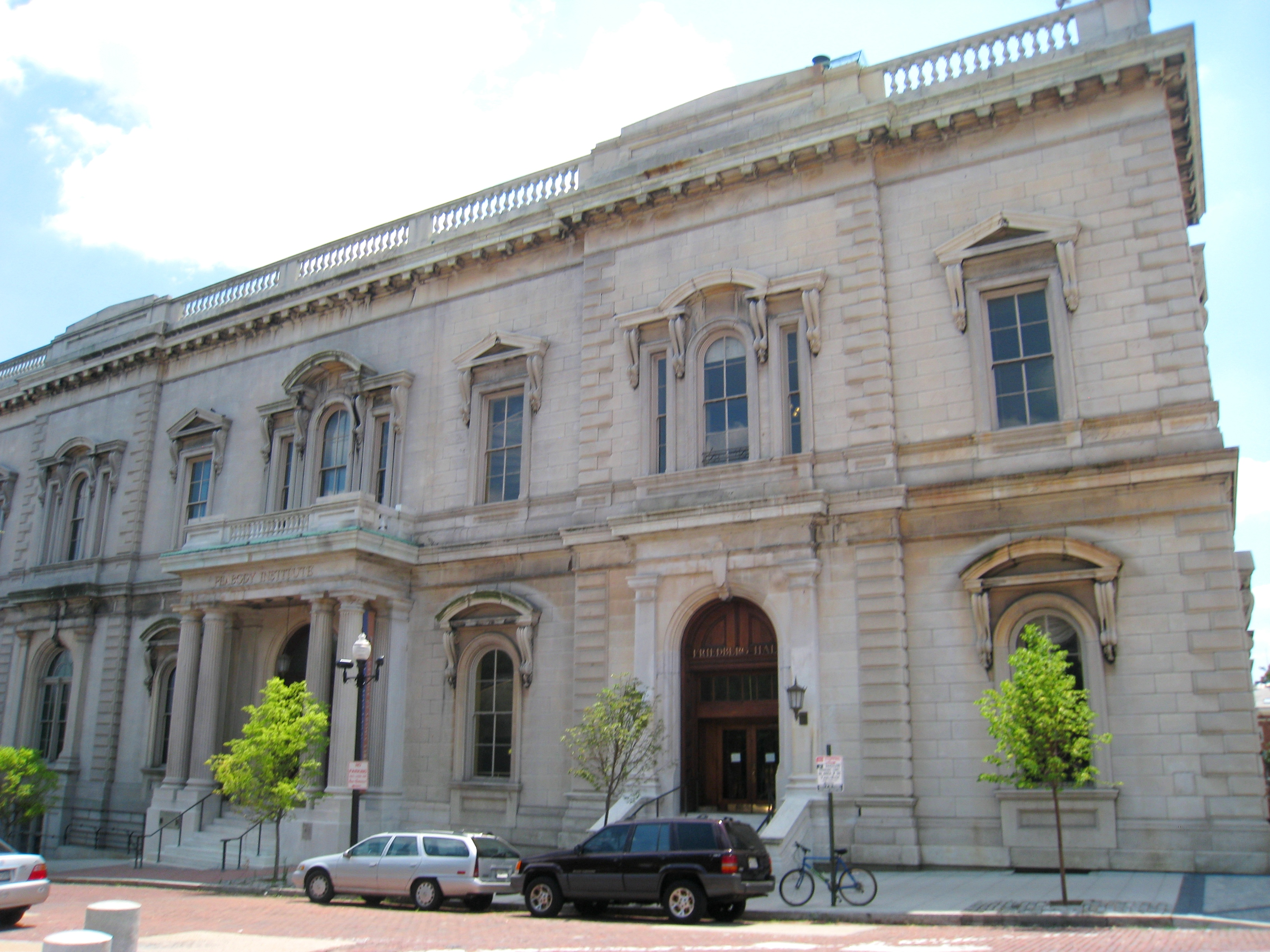
Peabody Institute in Mount Vernon, Baltimore

- Peabody Institute: founded in 1857, is the oldest continuously active music conservatory in the United States; it became a division of Johns Hopkins in 1977. The Conservatory retains its own student body and grants degrees in musicology and performance, though all Hopkins and Peabody students may take courses at both institutions.

=== Harbor East ===
- Carey Business School: The Carey Business School was established in 2007, incorporating divisions of the former School of Professional Studies in Business and Education. It was originally located on Charles Street, but relocated to the Legg Mason building in Harbor East in 2011.

=== Washington, D.C. ===
In 2019, Hopkins announced its purchase of the former Newseum building located at 555 Pennsylvania Avenue, three blocks from the United States Capitol, to house its Washington, D.C. programs and centers. In 2023, the building was officially reopened as the Johns Hopkins University Bloomberg Center, a 435,000-square-foot education facility that would house several divisions of the university.

- School of Advanced International Studies (SAIS) is located in the Hopkins Bloomberg Center in Washington D.C., near the National Gallery of Art on Pennsylvania Avenue. In a 2024 survey, 65 percent of respondents ranked SAIS as a top 5 master's degree program in international relations, placing the program as the second-best in the nation.

The Hopkins Bloomberg Center will also host programs within the Carey School of Business, Krieger School of Arts and Sciences, and Peabody Institute.

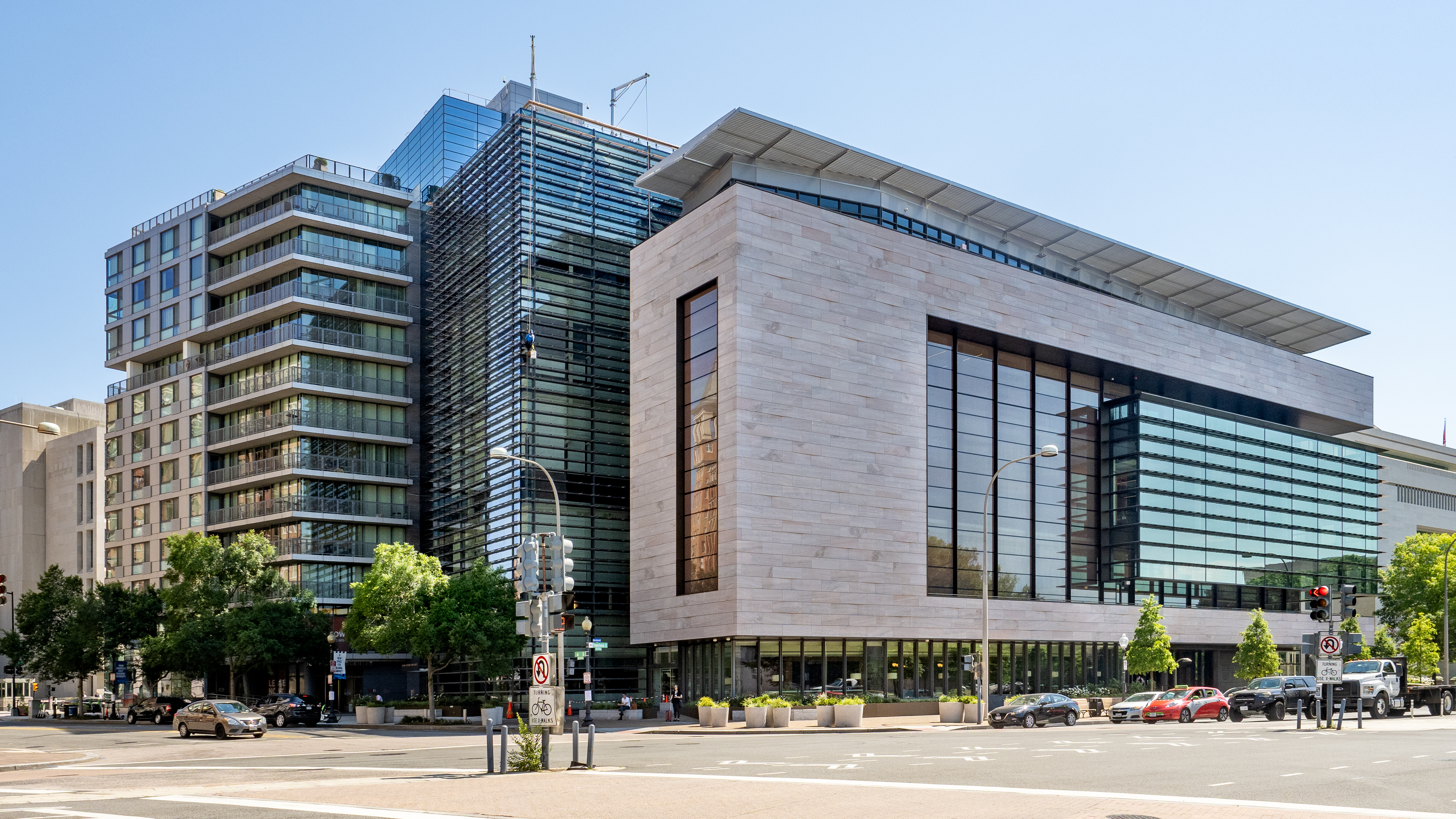
The Hopkins Bloomberg Center (Previously the Newseum)

=== Laurel, Maryland ===
The Applied Physics Laboratory (APL), in Laurel, Maryland, specializes in research for the U.S. Department of Defense, NASA, and other government and civilian research agencies. Among other projects, it has designed, built, and flown spacecraft for NASA to the asteroid Eros, and the planets Mercury and Pluto. It has developed more than 100 biomedical devices, many in collaboration with the Johns Hopkins Medical Institutions. Akin to the Washington, D.C. campus for the School of Arts and Sciences, APL also is the primary campus for master's degrees in a variety of STEM fields.

=== Other campuses ===
==== Domestic ====
- Montgomery County, Maryland, a campus for part-time programs in biosciences, engineering, business, and education

==== International ====
- Hopkins–Nanjing Center
- SAIS Europe - European campus of the School of Advanced International Studies (SAIS), located in Bologna, Italy

== Organization ==
The Johns Hopkins entity is structured as two corporations, the university and The Johns Hopkins Health System, formed in 1986. The president is JHU's chief executive officer and the university is organized into nine academic divisions.

JHU's bylaws specify a board of trustees of between 18 and 65 voting members. Trustees serve six-year terms subject to a two-term limit. The alumni select 12 trustees. Four recent alumni serve 4-year terms, one per year, typically from the graduating class. The bylaws prohibit students, faculty or administrative staff from serving on the board, except the president as an ex-officio trustee. The Johns Hopkins Health System has a separate board of trustees, many of whom are doctors or health care executives.

== Academics ==
The full-time, four-year undergraduate program is "most selective" with low transfer-in and a high graduate co-existence. The Princeton Review rates the selectivity of Johns Hopkins as 99/99. As of 2025, the cost of attendance per academic year without financial aid is approximately $89,000. However, 51% of full-time undergraduates receive financial aid covering 100% of their need. The admit rate of Hopkins undergraduates to medical school is 80% and to law school is 97%, some of the highest rates in the US. The university is one of fourteen founding members of the Association of American Universities (AAU); it is also a member of the Consortium on Financing Higher Education (COFHE) and the Universities Research Association (URA).

=== Rankings ===
Academic rankings

National
- Forbes: 8
- U.S. News & World Report: 7 (tie)
- Washington Monthly: 5

Global
- ARWU: 19
- QS: 20
- THE: 16
- U.S. News & World Report: 17

As of 2025, Johns Hopkins University was ranked the 7th best university in the nation (tied) and 14th best globally by U.S. News & World Report.

Institution	Specialization	US Rank	Site
Johns Hopkins University	Overall	7 (tie)	U.S. News & World Report
Johns Hopkins University	Pre-med	2	Prepscholar, Medicalaid (2021)
Zanvyl Krieger School of Arts and Sciences	Neuroscience / Neurobiology	4 (tie)	U.S. News & World Report
Zanvyl Krieger School of Arts and Sciences	Molecular Biology	3 (tie)	U.S. News & World Report
Zanvyl Krieger School of Arts and Sciences	Physics	13 (tie)	U.S. News & World Report
Whiting School of Engineering	Biomedical Engineering	1 (tie)	U.S. News & World Report
Whiting School of Engineering	Computer Science	21	U.S. News & World Report
Whiting School of Engineering	Undergraduate Engineering	13 (tie)	U.S. News & World Report
Johns Hopkins School of Medicine	Medicine (Research)	2	U.S. News & World Report
Johns Hopkins Bloomberg School of Public Health	Public Health	1	U.S. News & World Report
Johns Hopkins Bloomberg School of Public Health	Biostatistics	1 (tie)	U.S. News & World Report
Johns Hopkins University School of Nursing	Nursing (Master's)	2	U.S. News & World Report
Johns Hopkins University School of Nursing	Doctor of Nursing Practice	1	U.S. News & World Report
Peabody Institute	Music	5	Niche (2024)
School of Advanced International Studies	International Relations	2	Foreign Policy (2024)
Zanvyl Krieger School of Arts and Sciences	History	8 (tie)	U.S. News & World

=== Undergraduate admissions ===
Johns Hopkins University
Class of 2029 Applicants	49,112
Class of 2029 Admitted (n, %)	2,525, 5.14%
SAT Range (middle 50th percentile, 2029 data)	1530–1570
ACT Range (middle 50th percentile, 2029 data)	35

The university's undergraduate programs are among the most highly selective in the nation. In 2025 the Office of Admissions accepted 5.1% of its 49,112 applicants. The median range SAT score for the enrolled Class of 2029 was 1530-1570 with a median ACT of 35. 99% of enrolled students graduated in the top 10% of their high school class. Over time, applications to Johns Hopkins University have risen steadily; as a result, the selectivity of Johns Hopkins University has also increased. Early Decision I is an option at Johns Hopkins University for students who wish to demonstrate that the university is their first choice. These students, if admitted, are required to enroll. This application is due November 1. There is also another binding Early Decision II application due January 3. Many students, however, apply Regular Decision, which is a traditional non-binding round. These applications are due January 3 and students are notified in mid-March. The cost to apply to Hopkins is $70, though fee waivers are available. In 2014, Johns Hopkins ended legacy preference in admissions. Johns Hopkins practices need-blind admission and meets the full financial need of all admitted students.

Population
Year	Applicants	Growth	Acceptance rate	Accepted	Enrolled	Yield
2025	50,259	+11.4%	5.1%	2,525	1,378	55%
2024	45,134	+17.9%	5.7%	2,558	1,288	50%
2023	38,294	+3.1%	6.3%	2,403	1,306	54%
2022	37,156	-4.0%	6.5%	2,407	1,310	54%
2021	38,725	+30.8%	6.4%	2,476	1,336	54%
2020	29,612	-8.1%	8.8%	2,604	1,300	50%

=== Libraries ===
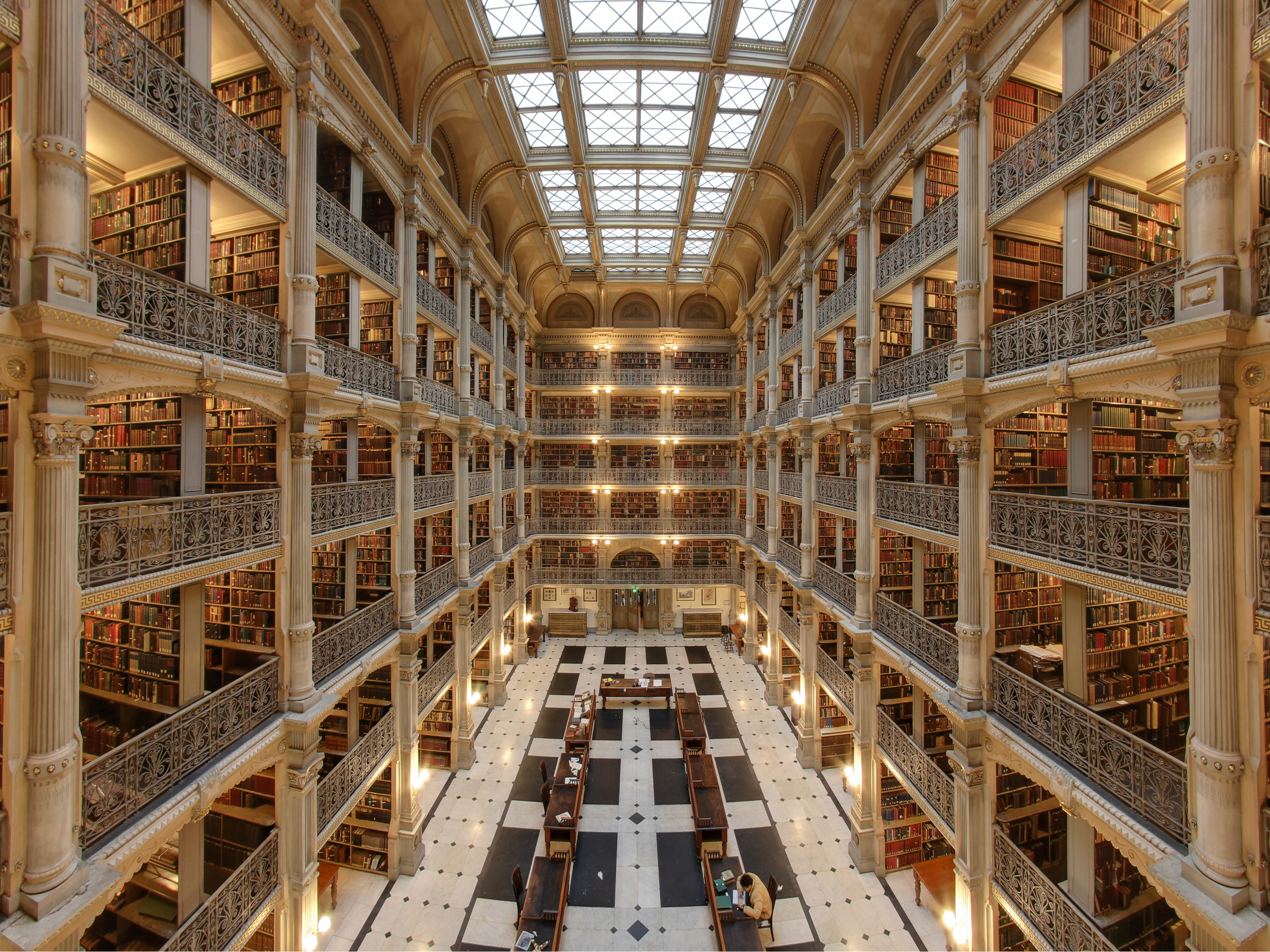
The George Peabody Library at Johns Hopkins University

The Johns Hopkins University Library system houses more than 3.6 million volumes and includes ten main divisions across the university's campuses. The largest segment of this system is the Sheridan Libraries, encompassing the Milton S. Eisenhower Library (the main library of the Homewood campus), the Brody Learning Commons, the Hutzler Reading Room ("The Hut") in Gilman Hall, the John Work Garrett Library at Evergreen House, and the George Peabody Library at the Peabody Institute campus.

The main library, constructed in the 1960s, was named for Milton S. Eisenhower, former president of the university and brother of former U.S. president Dwight D. Eisenhower. The university's stacks had previously been housed in Gilman Hall and departmental libraries. Only two of the Eisenhower library's six stories are above ground, though the building was designed so that every level receives natural light. The design accords with campus lore that no structure can be taller than Gilman Hall, the flagship academic building. A four-story expansion to the library, known as the Brody Learning Commons, opened in August 2012. The expansion features an energy-efficient, state-of-the-art technology infrastructure and includes study spaces, seminar rooms, and a rare books collection.

=== Johns Hopkins University Press ===
The Johns Hopkins University Press is the publishing division of the Johns Hopkins University. It was founded in 1878 and holds the distinction of being the oldest continuously running university press in the United States. To date the Press has published more than 6,000 titles and currently publishes 65 scholarly periodicals and over 200 new books each year. Since 1993, the Johns Hopkins University Press has run Project MUSE, an online collection of over 250 full-text, peer-reviewed journals in the humanities and social sciences. The Press also houses the Hopkins Fulfilment Services (HFS), which handles distribution for a number of university presses and publishers. Taken together, the three divisions of the Press—Books, Journals (including MUSE) and HFS—make it one of the largest of America's university presses.

=== Center for Talented Youth ===
The Johns Hopkins University also offers the Center for Talented Youth program, a nonprofit organization dedicated to identifying and developing the talents of the most promising K-12 grade students worldwide. As part of the Johns Hopkins University, the "Center for Talented Youth" or CTY helps fulfill the university's mission of preparing students to make significant future contributions to the world. The Johns Hopkins Digital Media Center (DMC) is a multimedia lab space as well as an equipment, technology and knowledge resource for students interested in exploring creative uses of emerging media and use of technology.

=== Degrees offered ===
Johns Hopkins offers a number of degrees in various undergraduate majors leading to the BA and BS and various majors leading to the MA, MS and PhD for graduate students. Because Hopkins offers both undergraduate and graduate areas of study, many disciplines have multiple degrees available. Biomedical engineering, perhaps one of Hopkins's best-known programs, offers bachelor's, master's, and doctoral degrees.

== Research ==
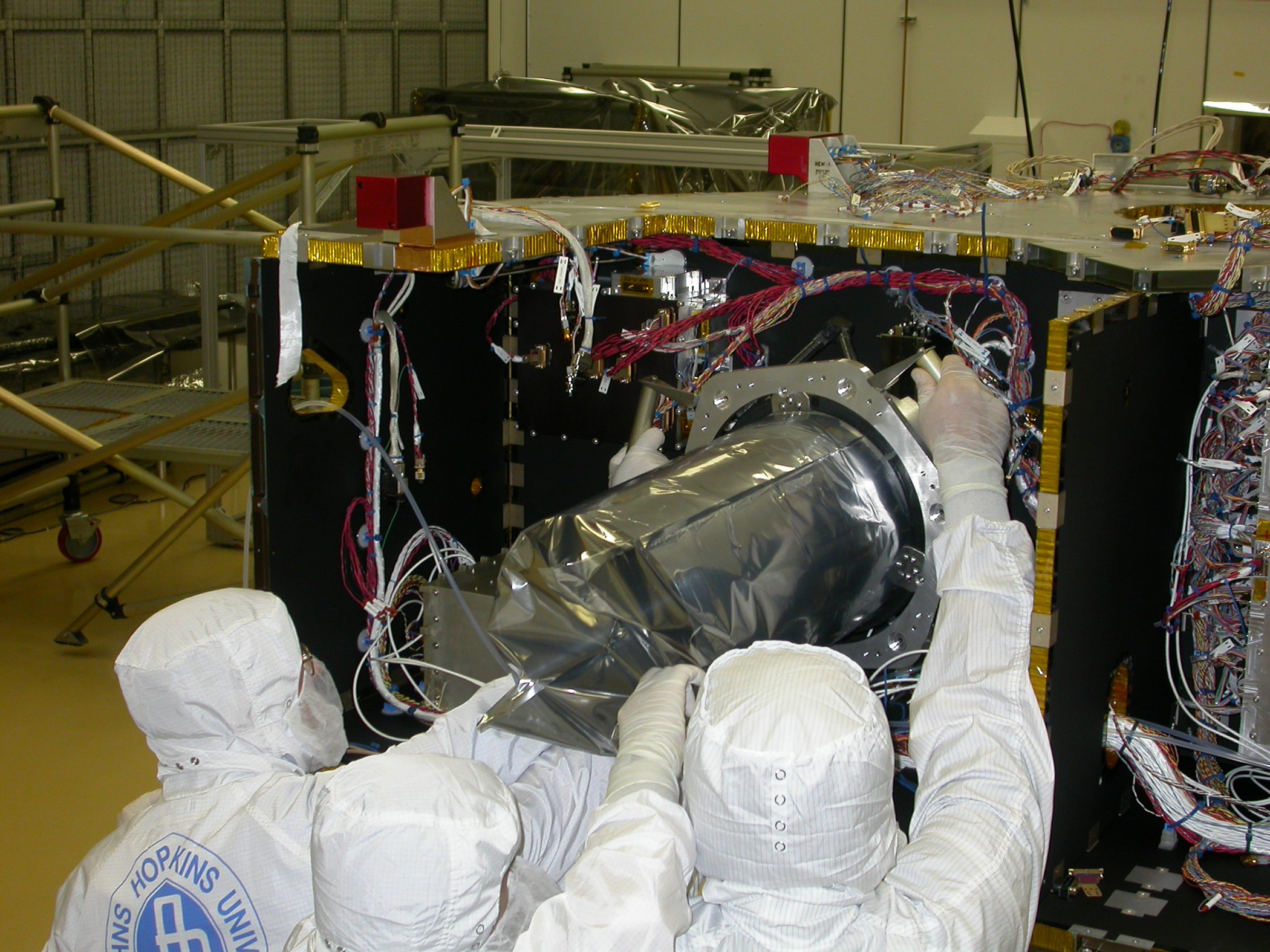
Installing a New Horizons imager at Johns Hopkins University's Applied Physics Laboratory in Laurel, Maryland

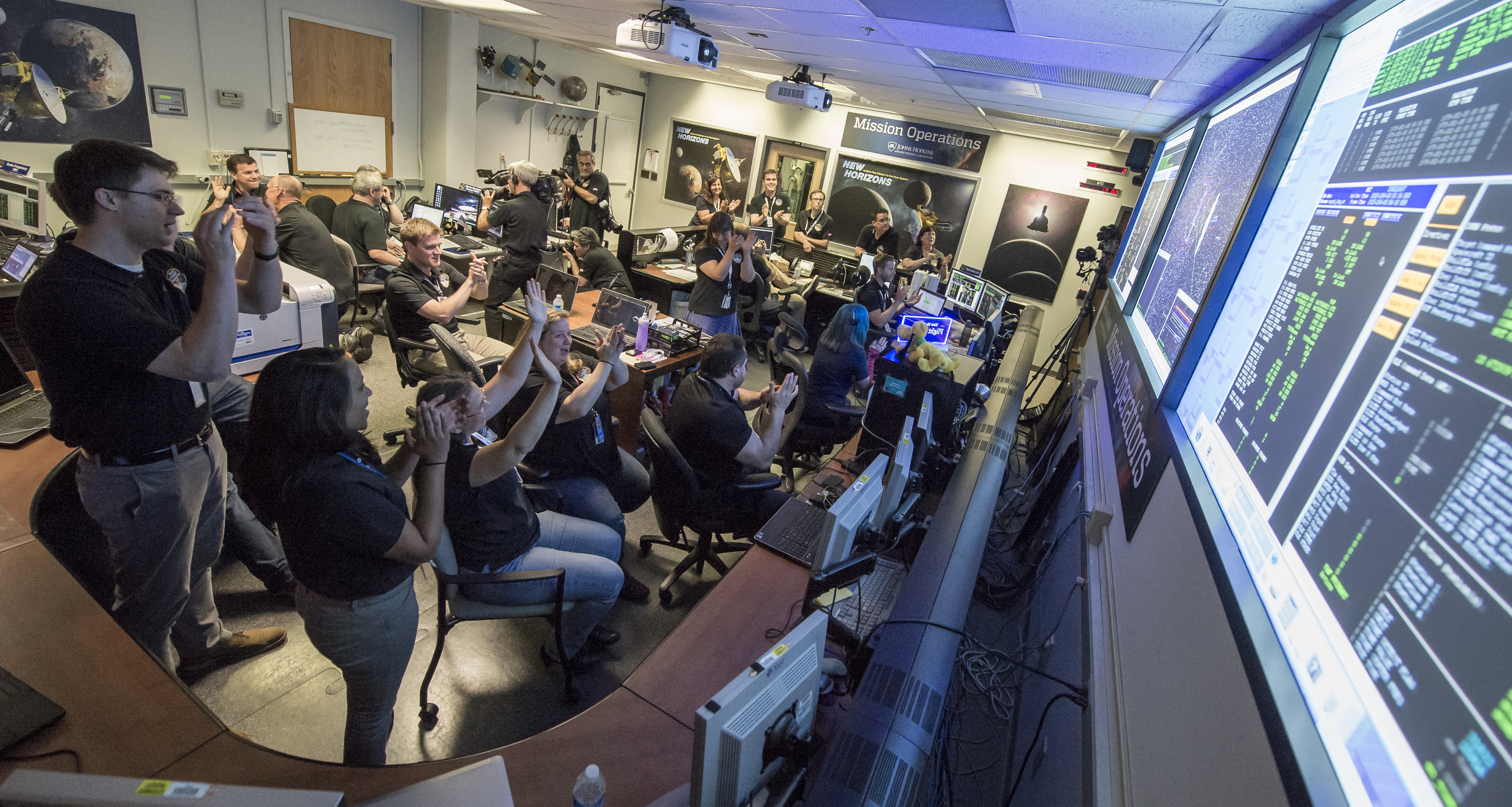
View of Mission Operations at the Applied Physics Laboratory in Laurel, Maryland

The opportunity to participate in important research is one of the distinguishing characteristics of Hopkins's undergraduate education. About 80 percent of undergraduates perform independent research, often alongside top researchers. In fiscal year 2020, Johns Hopkins spent nearly $3.1 billion on research, more than any other U.S. university for over 40 consecutive years. Johns Hopkins has had seventy-seven members of the Institute of Medicine, forty-three Howard Hughes Medical Institute Investigators, seventeen members of the National Academy of Engineering, and sixty-two members of the National Academy of Sciences. As of March 2025, 34 Nobel Prize winners have been affiliated with the university as alumni, faculty members or researchers, with the most recent winners being Gregg Semenza and William G. Kaelin.

Between 1999 and 2009, Johns Hopkins was among the most cited institutions in the world. It attracted nearly 1,222,166 citations and produced 54,022 papers under its name, ranking third globally after Harvard University and the Max Planck Society in the number of total citations published in Thomson Reuters-indexed journals over 22 fields in America. In 2020, Johns Hopkins University ranked 5 in number of utility patents granted out of all institutions in the world.

In 2000, Johns Hopkins received $95.4 million in research grants from the National Aeronautics and Space Administration (NASA), making it the leading recipient of NASA research and development funding. In FY 2002, Hopkins became the first university to cross the $1 billion threshold on either list, recording $1.14 billion in total research and $1.023 billion in federally sponsored research.

In 2025, per a National Science Foundation (NSF) ranking, Johns Hopkins University performed $4.13 billion in total R&D, over $2.5 billion of which went to its Applied Physics Laboratory, making it the largest spender on R&D among U.S. educational institutions.

In 2013, the Bloomberg Distinguished Professorships program was established by a $250 million gift from Michael Bloomberg. This program enables the university to recruit fifty researchers from around the world to joint appointments throughout the nine divisions and research centers. Each professor must be a leader in interdisciplinary research and be active in undergraduate education. Directed by Vice Provost for Research Denis Wirtz, there are currently thirty two Bloomberg Distinguished Professors at the university, including three Nobel Laureates, eight fellows of the American Association for the Advancement of Science, ten members of the American Academy of Arts and Sciences, and thirteen members of the National Academies.

=== Research centers and institutes ===
==== Divisional ====
- School of Medicine (28)
- School of Public Health (70)
- School of Nursing (2)
- School of Arts and Sciences (27)
- School of Advanced International Studies (17)
- School of Engineering (16)
- School of Education (3)
- School of Business
- Applied Physics Laboratory

==== Others ====
- Berman Institute of Bioethics
- Center for a Livable Future
- Center for Talented Youth
- Graduate Program in Public Management
- Johns Hopkins Institute for Policy Studies
- Institute for Applied Economics, Global Health, and the Study of Business Enterprise
- Space Telescope Science Institute

== Student life ==
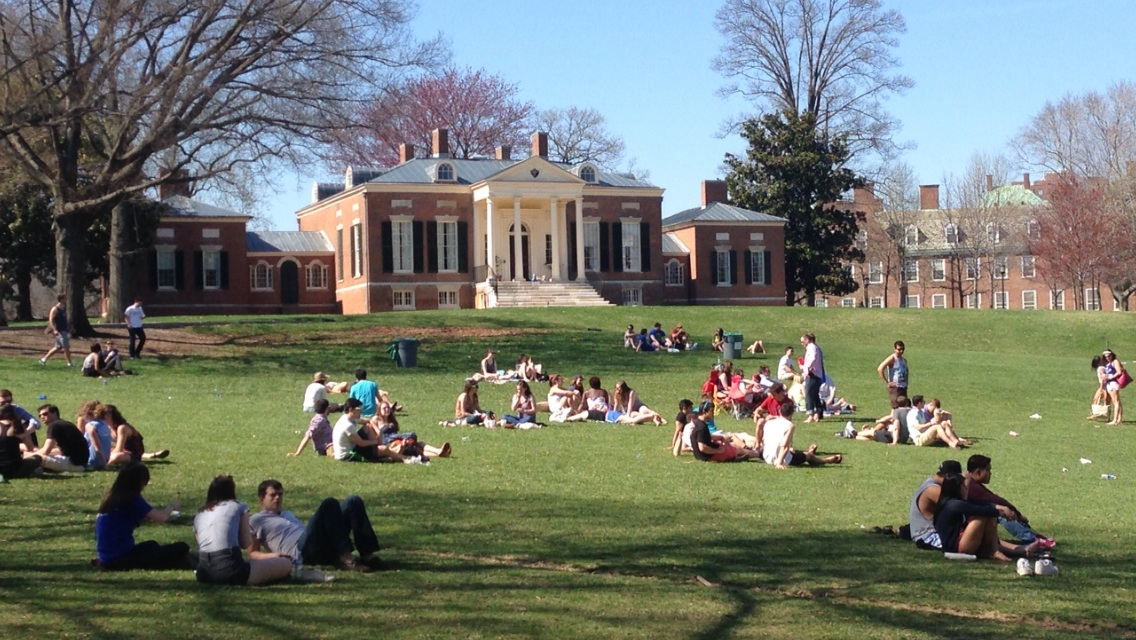
Students socializing on "the Beach" with Homewood House in the background

Student body composition as of Fall 2025
Race and ethnicity	Total
Asian	34%
White	20%
Hispanic	16%
Foreign national	14%
Other (Note: Other consists of multiracial Americans and those who prefer to not say.)	8%
Black	7%
Economic diversity
Low-income (Note: The percentage of students who received an income-based federal Pell grant intended for low-income students.)	20%
Affluent (Note: The percentage of students who are a part of the American middle class at the bare minimum.)	80%

Charles Village, the region of North Baltimore surrounding the university, has undergone several restoration projects, and the university has gradually bought the property around the school for additional student housing and dormitories. The Charles Village Project, completed in 2008, brought new commercial spaces to the neighborhood. The project included Charles (now Scott-Bates) Commons, a new, modern residence hall that includes popular retail franchises. In 2015, the university began development of new commercial properties, including a modern upperclassmen apartment complex, restaurants and eateries, and a CVS retail store.

Hopkins has invested in improving campus life. An 80,000 square foot recreational facility, the Ralph S. O'Connor Recreation Center, opened in 2002 and underwent major renovations in 2021. The facility includes an aquatics center, three multipurpose indoor courts, multiple weight rooms, a cardio floor, and a three-lane indoor track. The large on-campus dining facilities at Homewood were renovated in the summer of 2006.

The Bloomberg Student Center, opened in August 2025, includes four floors of seating areas, meeting spaces for student organizations and campus events, a theater, multipurpose rooms, a restaurant and lounge, and new dining options for students to choose from.

Quality of life is enriched by the proximity of neighboring academic institutions, including Loyola College, Maryland Institute College of Art (MICA), UMBC, Goucher College, and Towson University, as well as the nearby neighborhoods of Hampden, the Inner Harbor, Fells Point, and Mount Vernon.

=== Fraternity and sorority life ===
Fraternity and sorority life came to Hopkins in 1876 with the chartering of Beta Theta Pi fraternity, which still exists on campus today. As of Spring 2025, Johns Hopkins is home to seven social fraternities and five social sororities, as well as ten culturally-based sororities and fraternities. The seven social fraternities at Hopkins all belong to the national North-American Interfraternity Conference and are locally governed by the Interfraternity Council (IFC). The five social sororities at Hopkins belong to the National Panhellenic Conference and are locally governed by the Panhellenic Association at Johns Hopkins. Alpha Phi Alpha, a historically black fraternity, was founded in 1991, Lambda Phi Epsilon, an Asian-interest fraternity, was founded in 1994, and Lambda Upsilon Lambda, a Latino-interest fraternity, was founded in 1995. Rush for all students occurs in the spring. Most fraternities keep houses in the nearby Charles Village or Oakenshawe neighborhoods, while sororities do not.

=== Traditions ===
While it has been speculated that Johns Hopkins has few traditions for a school of its age and that many past traditions have been forgotten, a handful of myths and customs are ubiquitous knowledge among the community. One myth surrounds the university seal that is embedded into the floor of the Gilman Hall foyer. The myth holds that any current student to step on the seal will never graduate. In reverence for this tradition, the seal has been fenced off from the rest of the room.

An annual winter event is the "Lighting of the Quads", a ceremony each winter during which the campus is lit up in holiday lights. Recent years have included singing and fireworks.

The Spring Fair has been a Johns Hopkins tradition since 1972 and has since grown to be the largest student-run festival in the country. Popular among Hopkins students and Baltimore inhabitants alike, the Spring Fair features carnival rides, vendors, food and a beer garden. Since its beginning, Spring the fair has decreased in size, both in regard to attendance and utilization of space.

=== Housing ===
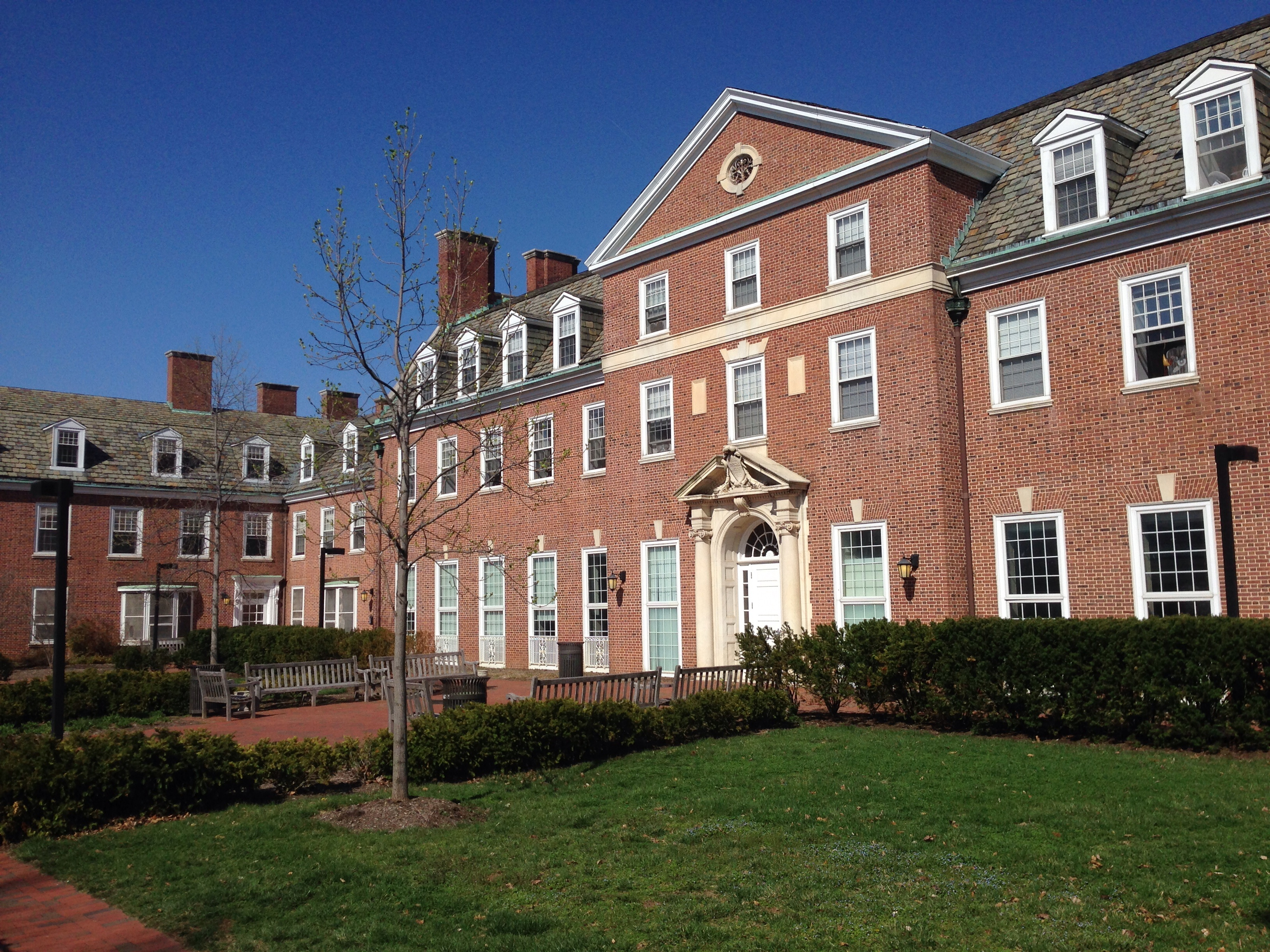
Alumni Memorial Residence I, a freshman dormitory on the Baltimore campus

Living on campus is typically required for first- and second-year undergraduates.

Freshman housing is centered around Freshman Quad, which consists of three residence hall complexes: The two Alumni Memorial Residences (AMR I and AMR II) plus Buildings A and B. The AMR dormitories are each divided into houses, subunits named for figures from the university's early history. Freshmen are also housed in Wolman Hall and in certain wings of McCoy Hall, both located slightly outside the campus.

Dorms at Hopkins are generally co-ed with same-gender rooms, though a policy has allowed students to live in mixed-gender rooms since Fall 2014.

Students determine where they will live during sophomore year through a housing lottery. Sophomores in university housing occupy one of four buildings: McCoy Hall, the Bradford Apartments, the Homewood Apartments, Scott-Bates Commons, and The Academy on Charles.

Most juniors and seniors move into nearby apartments or row-houses. Most are located in the neighboring Charles Village community. Forty-five percent of the student body lives off-campus while 55% lives on campus.

== Athletics ==
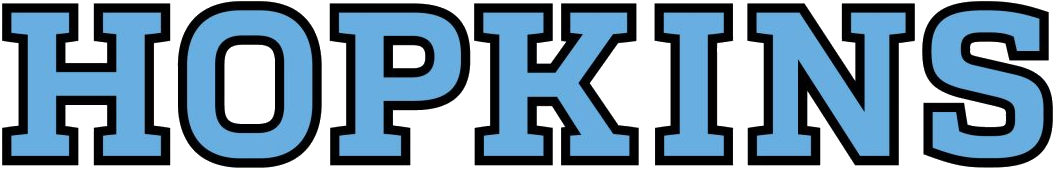
Johns Hopkins athletics wordmark

The university's athletic teams are the Johns Hopkins Blue Jays. Even though sable and gold are used for academic robes, the university's athletic colors are spirit blue (PMS 284) and black. Hopkins celebrates Homecoming in the spring to coincide with the height of the lacrosse season. The men's and women's lacrosse teams are in National Collegiate Athletic Association (NCAA) Division I and are affiliate members of the Big Ten Conference. Other teams are in Division III and participate in the Centennial Conference. JHU is also home to the Lacrosse Museum and National Hall of Fame, maintained by US Lacrosse.

The school's most prominent team is its men's lacrosse team. The team has won 44 national titles, nine NCAA Division I titles in 2007, 2005, 1987, 1985, 1984, 1980, 1979, 1978, and 1974, and 29 USILA championships, and six Intercollegiate Lacross Association (ILA) titles.

== Notable people ==
Prominent Johns Hopkins faculty and alumni include 34 Nobel laureates, 23 Rhodes Scholars, a Fields Medalist, a president of the United States, and two heads of government of foreign countries.

=== Notable alumni ===
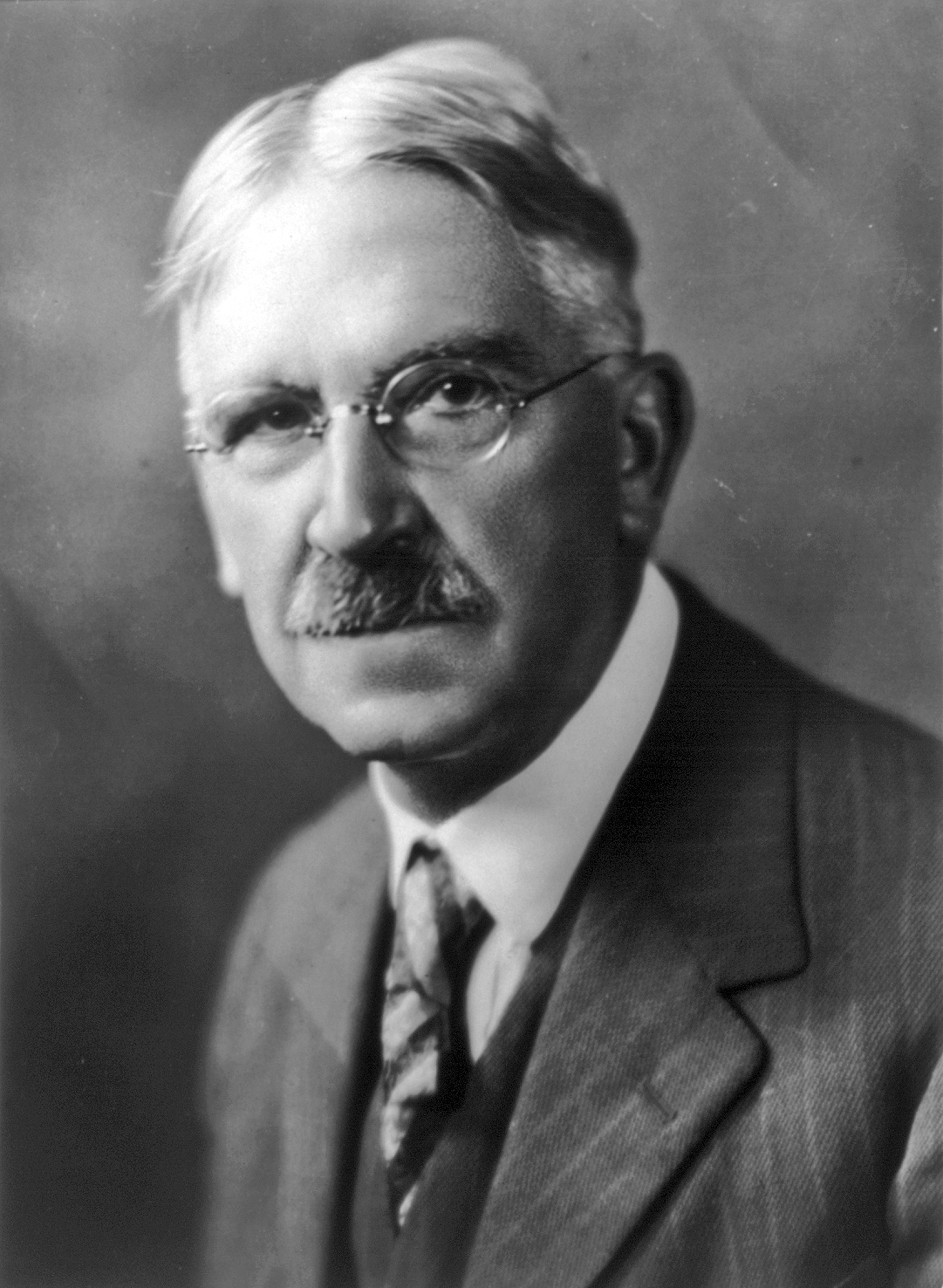
John Dewey (PhD 1884), philosopher and psychologist, cofounder of Pragmatism

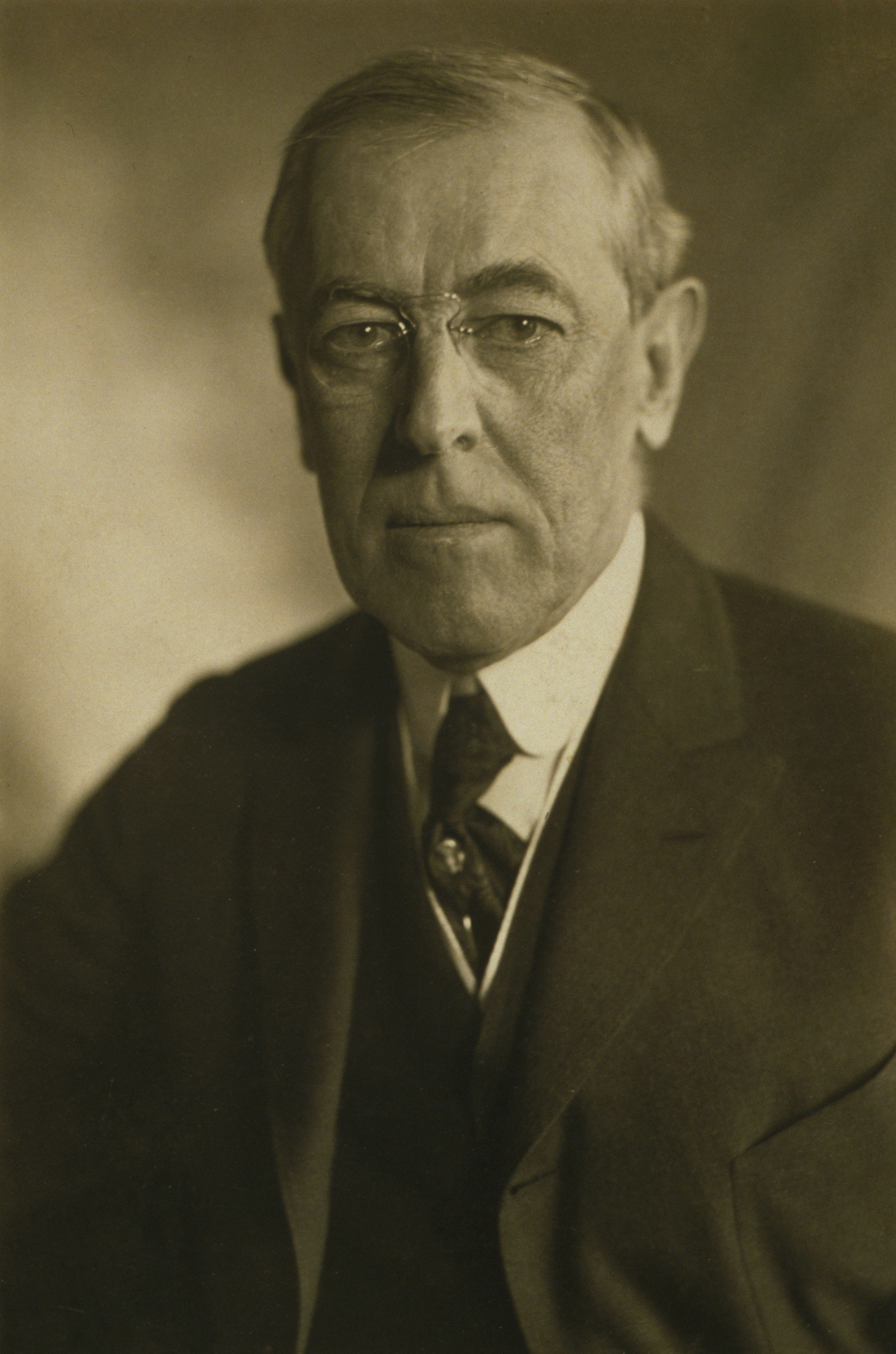
Woodrow Wilson (PhD 1886), 28th president of the United States (1913-1921)

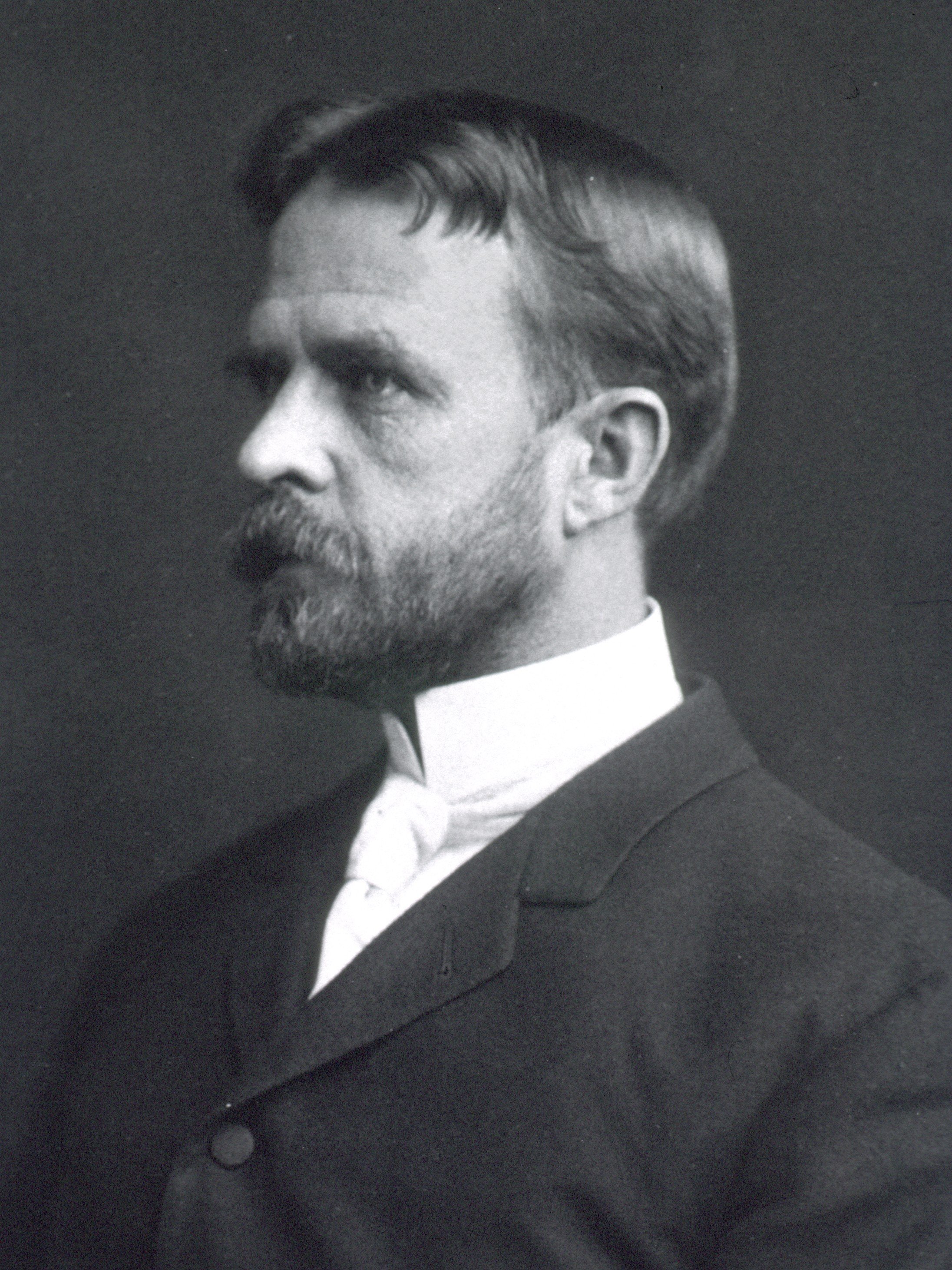
Thomas Hunt Morgan (PhD 1890), zoologist and geneticist, Nobel laureate in medicine

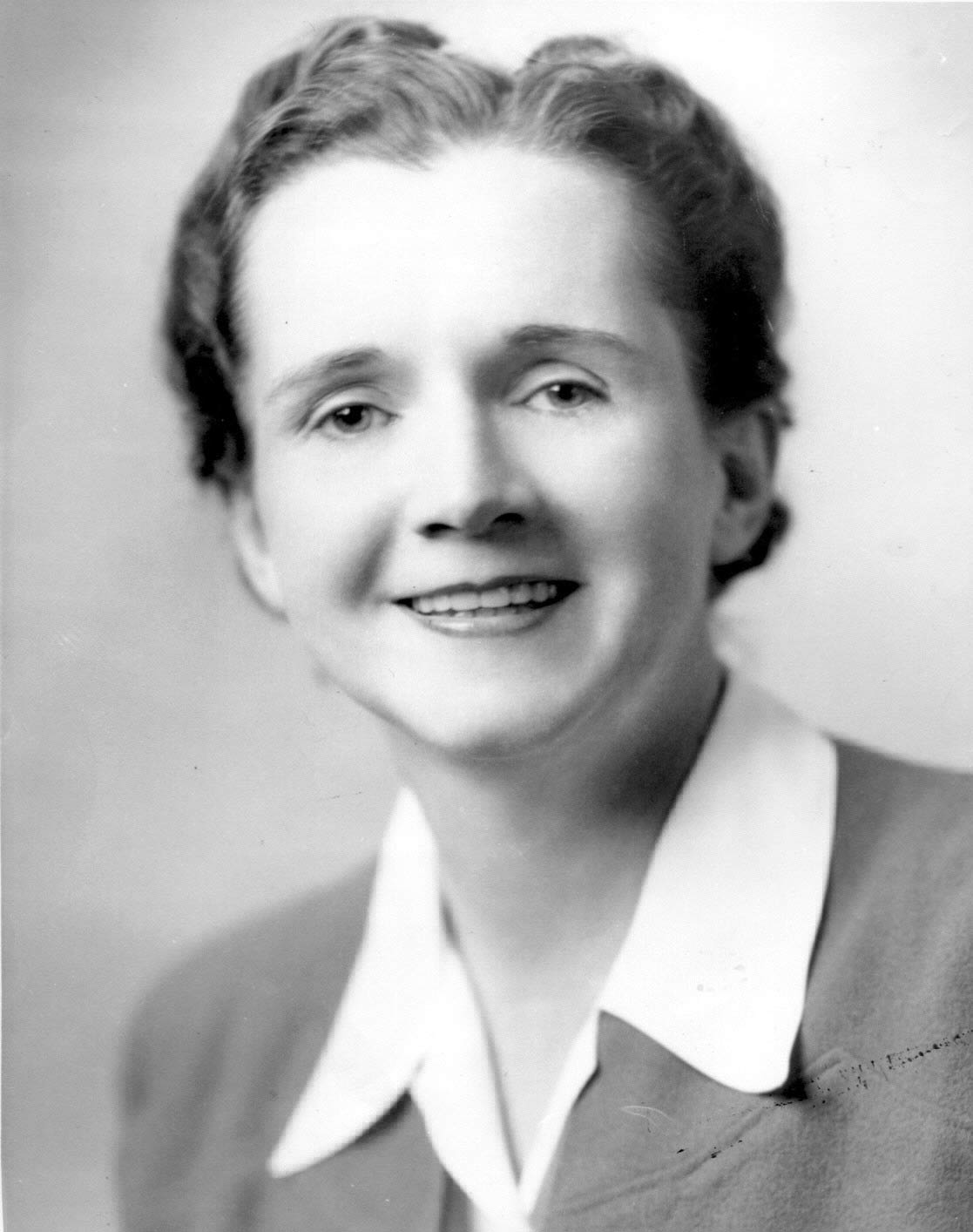
Rachel Carson (MS 1932), marine biologist and writer, author of Silent Spring

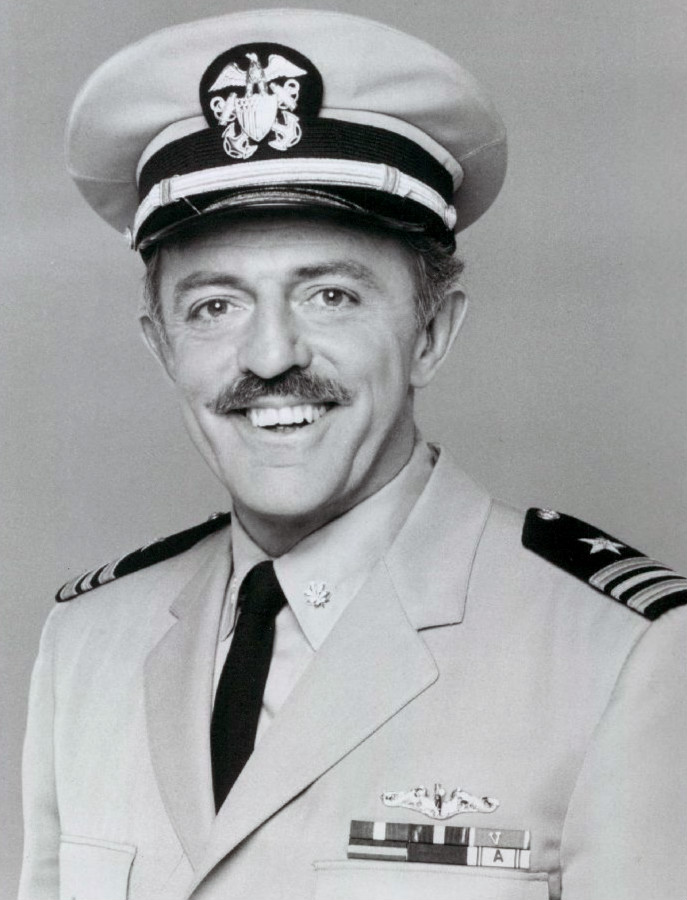
John Astin (BA 1952), actor and director, Gomez Adams in The Addams Family

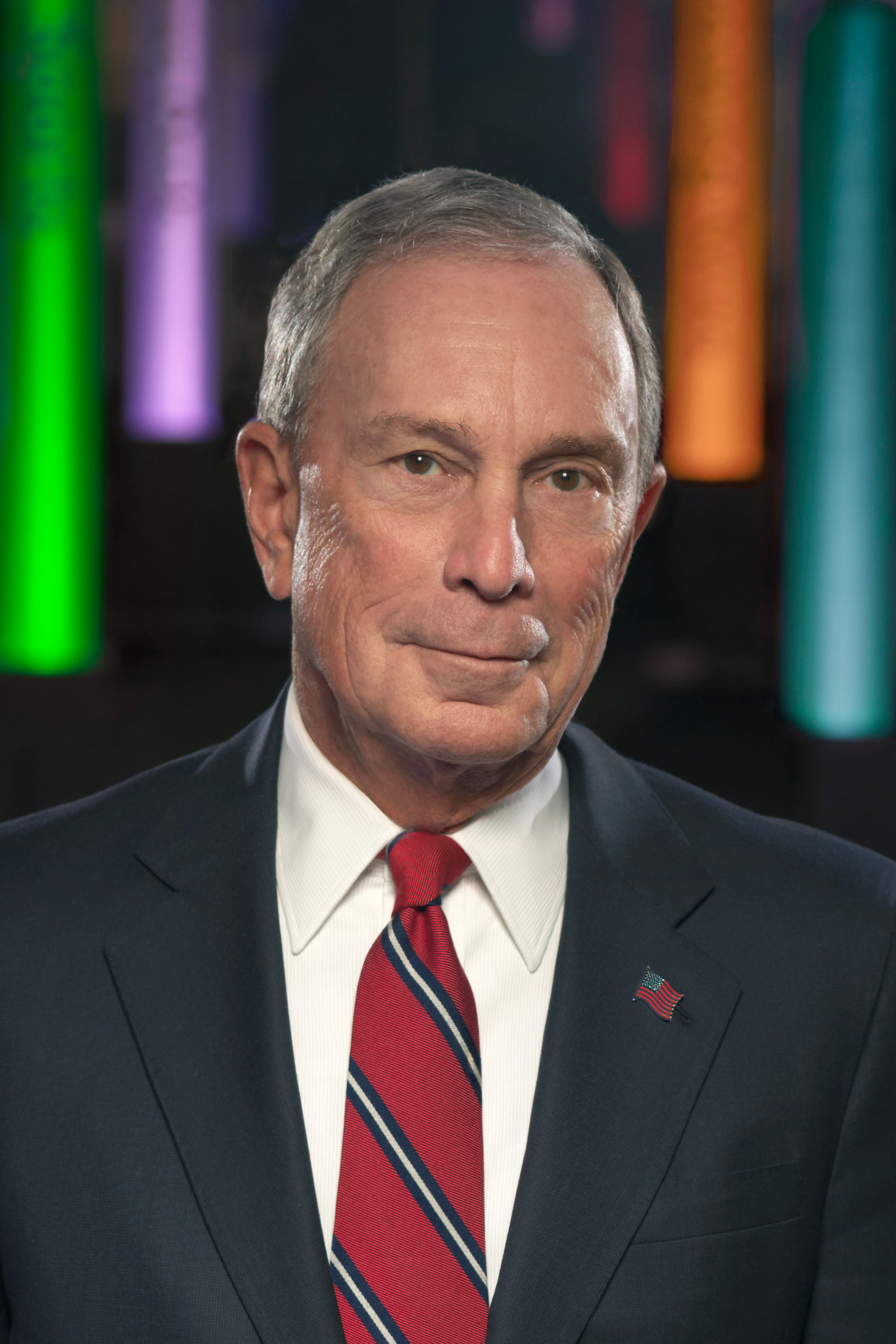
Mike Bloomberg (BS 1964), businessman, mayor of New York City

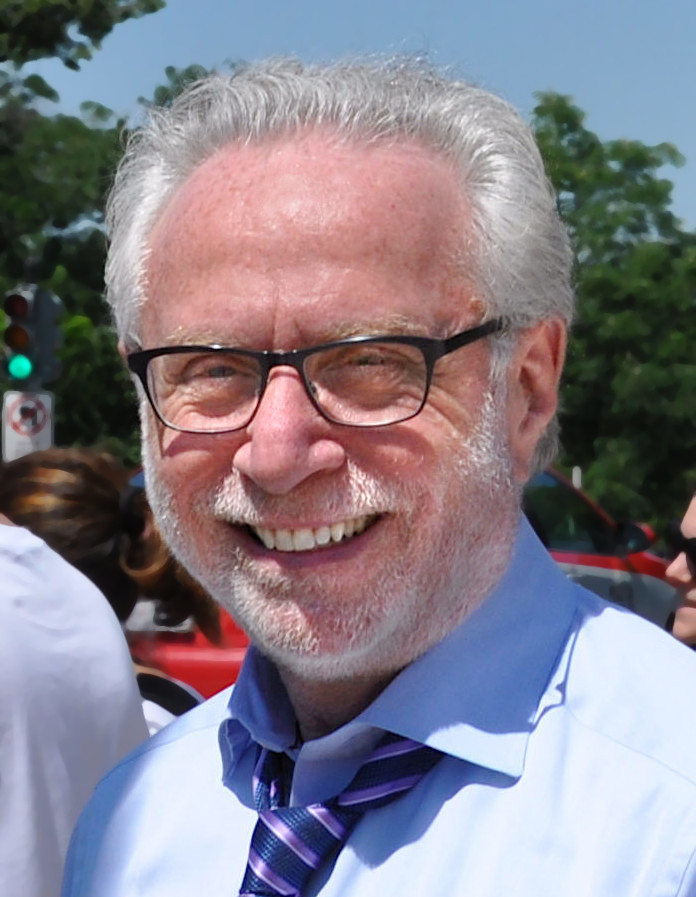
Wolf Blitzer (MA 1972) journalist and news anchor, host of CNN's The Situation Room

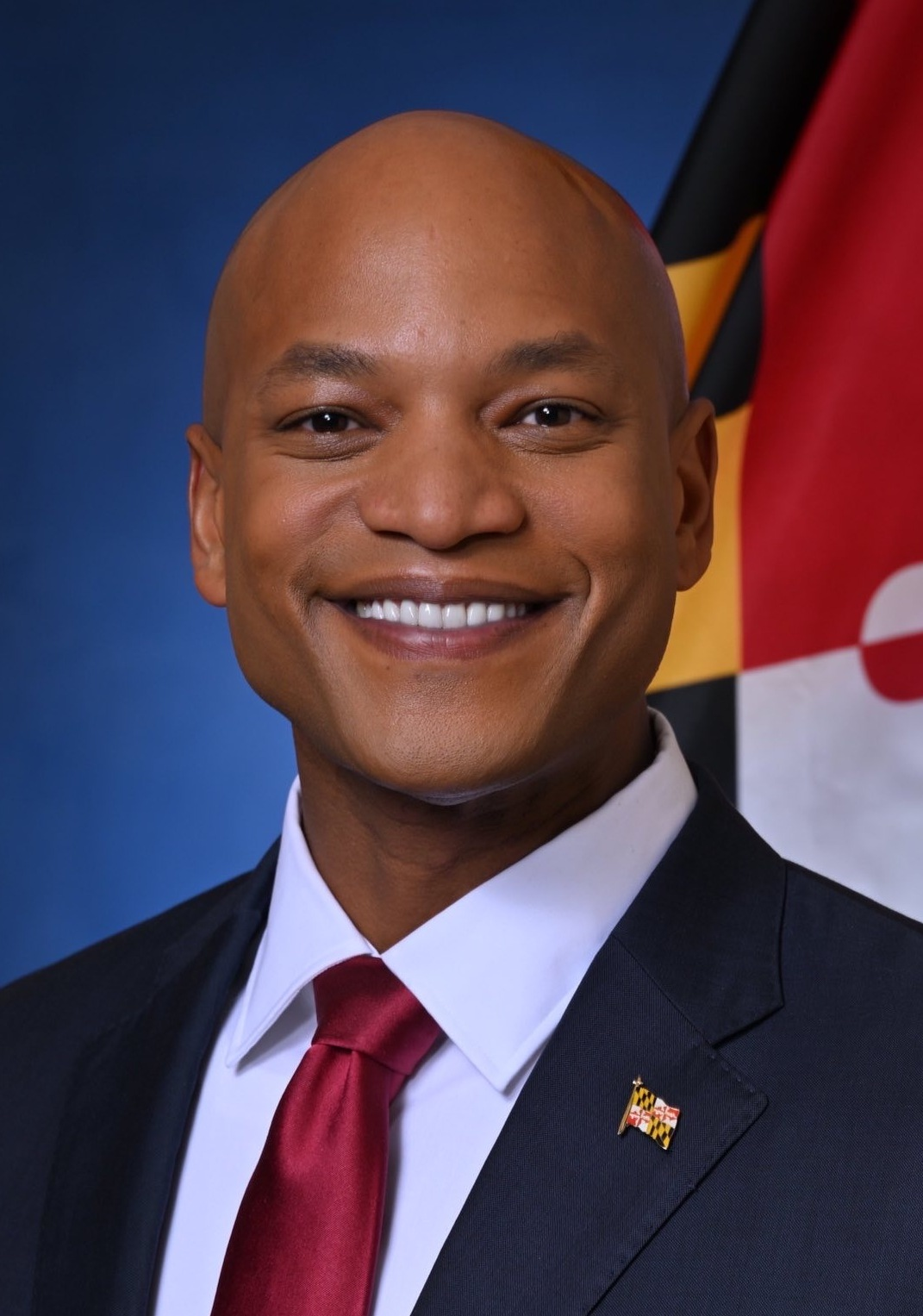
Wes Moore (BA 2001), 63rd governor of Maryland since 2023

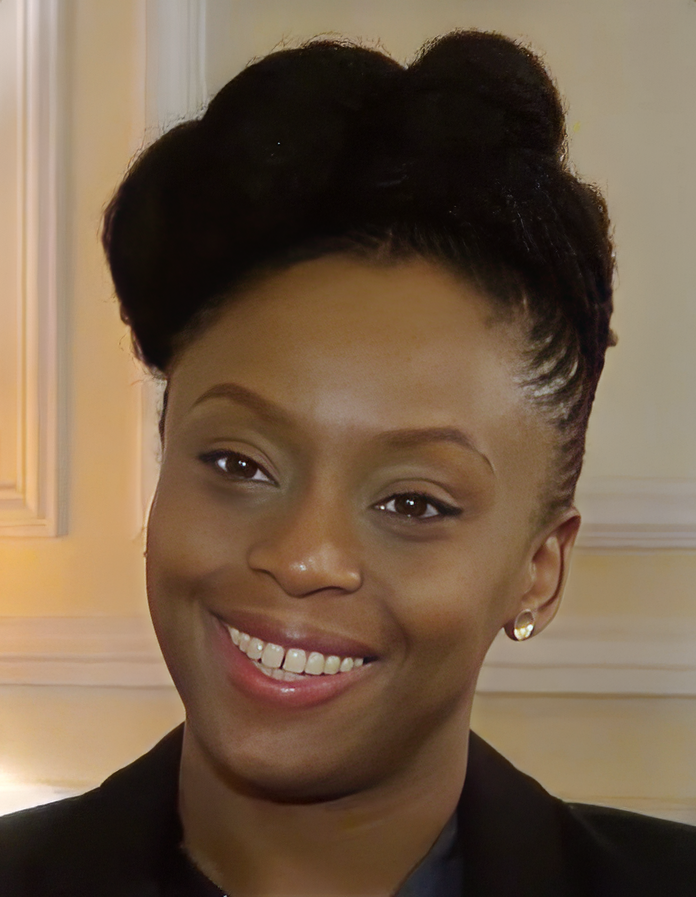
Chimamanda Ngozi Adichie (MA 2003), novelist and short story writer

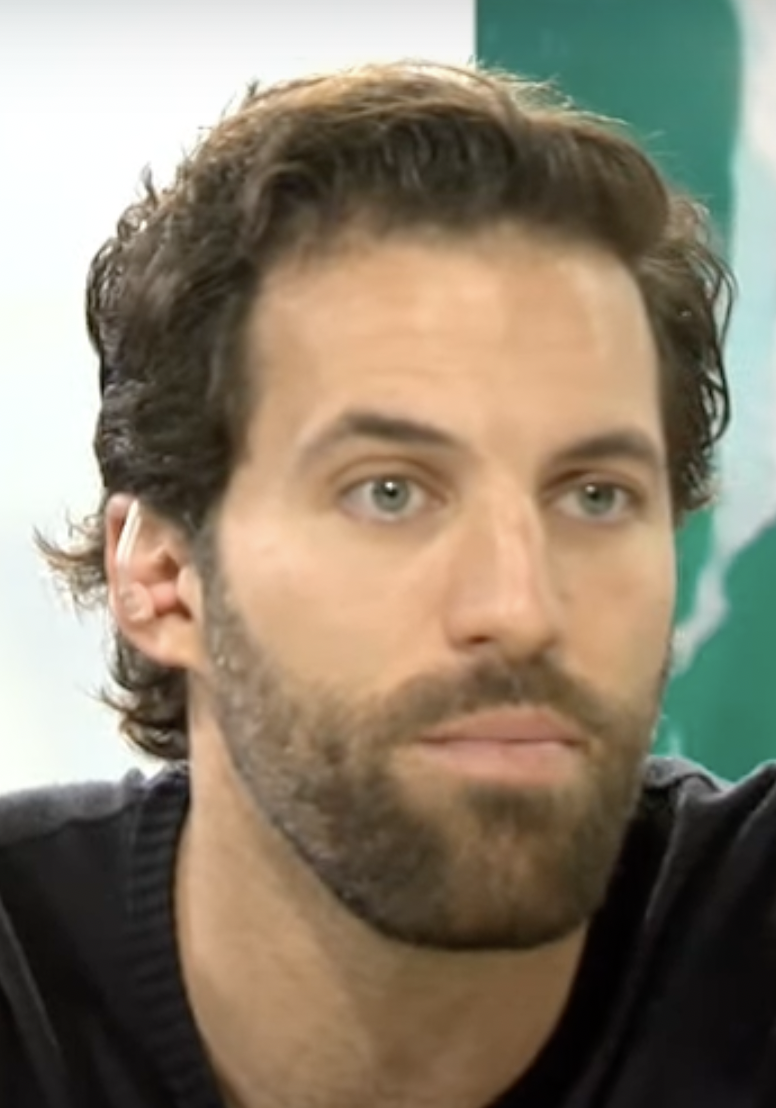
Paul Rabil (BA 2008), professional lacrosse player, founder of Premier Lacrosse League

Johns Hopkins was among the earliest institutions in the U.S. to grant doctorates and its graduates have made significant contributions across a wide range of academic disciplines. Notable academics and scholars who studied at Johns Hopkins include Thomas Hunt Morgan, who received the Nobel Prize for identifying chromosomes as the mechanical basis of heredity; pragmatist philosopher and psychologist John Dewey; economist Thorstein Veblen, who critiqued modern society in The Theory of the Leisure Class; mathematician John Charles Fields, the namesake of Fields Medal; historian Frederick Jackson Turner, who developed the "frontier thesis"; theoretical physicist John A. Wheeler, who was credited with coining the term "black hole"; and particle physicist and educator Frank Oppenheimer, the younger brother of J. Robert Oppenheimer.

The Johns Hopkins School of Medicine and Bloomberg School of Public Health, founded in 1893 and 1916, respectively, are among the top institutions in their fields. Graduates from the School of Medicine include Denton Cooley, who performed the first total artificial heart implantation; "father of medical genetics" Victor McKusick; Dorothy Reed Mendenhall, who discovered the Reed-Sternberg cells that characterize Hodgkin lymphoma; and Rochelle Walensky, Director of the CDC from 2021 to 2023. Modernist poet and novelist Gertrude Stein spent four years at the Johns Hopkins School of Medicine, but left before completing her degree. In the field of public health, alumni include D. A. Henderson, leader of the successful international effort to eradicate smallpox, and nursing field pioneer Margaret Gene Arnstein.

Many Hopkins alumni have become involved in politics and government. Alumni in the 119th Congress (2025-2027) include Representatives Lauren Underwood (IL-14), Andy Harris (MD-1), Sarah Elfreth (MD-3), and Kweisi Mfume (MD-7). Four U.S. Senators, Daniel Brewster, George L.P. Radcliffe, and John Marshall Butler of Maryland and Rudy Boschwitz of Minnesota have studied at Hopkins. In state and local politics, alumni include two Governors of Maryland, Wes Moore and Albert Ritchie, Maryland Lieutenant Governor and Republican National Committee chair Michael Steele, Baltimore Mayor Sheila Dixon, and president of the Baltimore City Council Zeke Cohen.

Woodrow Wilson, the first and only U.S. President to hold a doctoral degree, received his Ph.D. in history from Johns Hopkins in 1890. 39th vice president and Governor of Maryland (1967–1969) Spiro Agnew studied chemistry at Hopkins. Cabinet-level officials who attended Johns Hopkins include Secretary of War Newton D. Baker, Surgeon General Antonia Novello, Attorney General Benjamin Civiletti, and Treasury Secretary Timothy Geithner.

Since 1943, the School of Advanced International Studies has produced many diplomats and foreign affairs experts. Students at SAIS have included Madeleine Albright, the first female U.S. Secretary of State and John Hamre, president and CEO of the Center for Strategic and International Studies (CSIS). State Department official Alger Hiss, who was accused of spying for the Soviet Union by Whittaker Chambers, attended Hopkins as an undergraduate.

In business and finance, Hopkins' alumni include Bloomberg, L.P. founder and Mayor of New York City (2002–2013) Mike Bloomberg, stockbroker and Merrill co-founder Edmund C. Lynch, Liberty Media chairman and owner John C. Malone, former IBM CEO Samuel J. Palmisano, and former T. Rowe Price CEO and chairman Bill Stromberg.

The Writing Seminars at Johns Hopkins is the second-oldest creative writing program in the nation, and has produced such notable writers as post-colonialist Nigerian author Chimamanda Ngozi Adichie, Pulitzer Prize for Fiction winners John Barth and Louise Erdrich, journalist and The Rape of Nanking (1997) author Iris Chang, and jazz poet Gil Scott-Heron.

In television and journalism, alumni include CNN anchor Wolf Blitzer, senior Washington correspondent for NBC Hallie Jackson; political satirist and writer PJ O'Rourke, and Pulitzer Prize-winning New York Times columnist Russell Baker.

In the arts and entertainment, notable alumni include The Addams Family actor John Astin, cinematographer and six-time Academy Award nominee Caleb Deschanel, and horror film director Wes Craven, best known for the A Nightmare on Elm Street franchise and the cult classic films The Last House on the Left (1972) and The Hills Have Eyes (1977) .

In athletics, Johns Hopkins is primarily known for its long and historically dominant lacrosse tradition. Many of the most influential figures in the early history of the sport played at Hopkins, including the namesakes of the NCAA's Schmeisser Award for defensemen and Jack Turnbull Award for best attackman. More recent graduates of the men's lacrosse program include Premier Lacrosse League founder Paul Rabil and Tewaaraton Award winner Kyle Harrison, both considered among the greatest players of their generation. In other sports, Wes Unseld Jr., assistant coach for the NBA's Chicago Bulls and former Washington Wizards head coach, played college basketball at Hopkins.

=== Nobel laureates ===
As of March 2025, there have been 34 Nobel Laureates affiliated with Johns Hopkins as students, faculty, or researchers. Woodrow Wilson, who received his PhD from Johns Hopkins in 1886, was the university's first affiliated laureate, winning the Nobel Peace Prize in 1919.

Eighteen Johns Hopkins affiliates have won the Nobel Prize in Physiology or Medicine. Four Nobel Prizes were shared by Johns Hopkins laureates: George Minot and George Whipple won the 1934 Nobel Prize in Physiology or Medicine, Joseph Erlanger and Herbert Spencer Gasser won the 1944 Nobel Prize in Physiology or Medicine, Daniel Nathans and Hamilton O. Smith won the 1978 Nobel Prize in Physiology or Medicine, and David H. Hubel and Torsten N. Wiesel won the 1981 Nobel Prize in Physiology or Medicine.

Four Johns Hopkins affiliates have won Nobel Prizes in Physics: James Franck in 1925, Maria Goeppert-Mayer in 1963, Riccardo Giacconi in 2002, Bloomberg Distinguished Professor Adam Riess in 2011.

Bloomberg Distinguished Professor Peter Agre was awarded the 2003 Nobel Prize in Chemistry (which he shared with Roderick MacKinnon) for his discovery of aquaporins. Bloomberg Distinguished Professor Carol Greider was awarded the 2009 Nobel Prize for Physiology or Medicine, along with Elizabeth Blackburn and Jack W. Szostak, for their discovery that telomeres are protected from progressive shortening by the enzyme telomerase.

== In popular culture ==
The school's reputation has made it a frequent reference in media.

- The Hopkins Lacrosse Story (1992): With an unprecedented 43 national championship titles, Johns Hopkins has one of the most successful college lacrosse programs in the world. This documentary film traces the team's numerous historical accomplishments: its first championship in 1891, its wins at the Amsterdam (1928) and Los Angeles (1932) Olympic Games, and the current runs for the NCAA title.
- Hopkins 24/7 (2000): A six-part television documentary produced by ABC that gave viewers an inside look at life in the Johns Hopkins Hospital.
- Something the Lord Made (2004): An HBO movie that tells the story of an unusual partnership at Johns Hopkins Hospital between Alfred Blalock, one of the nation's pioneering surgeons, and Vivien Thomas, an African American surgical technician, who contributed to a surgical solution for the "blue baby" syndrome. It was filmed on the East Baltimore and Homewood campuses.
- Hopkins (2008): A seven-part documentary series on the Johns Hopkins Hospital produced by ABC shows the real life dramas taking place there each day for doctors, nurses, residents, and patients.
