= Studies in Higher Education =

- Discipline: higher education
- Language: English
- Edited by: Creso Sa

Publication details
- History: 1976-present
- Publisher: Routledge
- Frequency: 10/year plus 2 Special Issues (12 in total)

Standard abbreviations
- ISO 4: Stud. High. Educ.

Indexing
- ISSN: 0307-5079 (print); 1470-174X (web)
- LCCN: 82645927
- OCLC no.: 321022906

Links
- Journal homepage; Online access; Online archive

Studies in Higher Education is a peer-reviewed academic journal of higher education, published by Routledge on behalf of the Society for Research into Higher Education. As of May, 2022, its editor-in-chief is Creso Sa, University of Toronto.

Two issues per year were published until 1986, and three per year until 2001. Four were published in each of 2002 and 2003, and six issues per year from 2004 until 2008. It currently publishes ten issues per year, plus two Special Issues.

The May 2020 special issue contains articles on the use of Wikipedia as a pedagogical and assessment tool.
