= Johns Hopkins School of Education =

School of education at Johns Hopkins University

Coordinates: 39.327443°N 76.620777°W

The Johns Hopkins School of Education is the school of education of Johns Hopkins University, a private research university in Baltimore, Maryland, United States. Established as a separate school in 2007, its origins can be traced back to the 1909 Founding of Johns Hopkins's College Courses for Teachers, later renamed College for Teachers.

== History ==
Established formally as a separate school in 2007, the field of education has had a presence at Johns Hopkins since 1909, when the university established its College Courses for Teachers.

In 1979, a division launched a technology-for-educators graduate program. In 2014, it opened the Henderson-Hopkins School in East Baltimore. The School of Education founded the Center for Safe and Healthy Schools in 2019, and co-founded the eSchool+ Initiative in 2020 to develop resources for school closure and reopening during the COVID-19 pandemic.

The school is accredited by the Council for the Accreditation of Educator Preparation, formerly the National Council for Accreditation of Teacher Education, and the Council for Accreditation of Counseling and Related Educational Programs.

=== Centers ===
The school has five centers dedicated to education research and policy studies: The Center for Research and Reform in Education, the Center for Safe and Healthy Schools, the Center for Social Organization of Schools, the Center for Technology in Education, and the Institute for Education Policy.

=== Deans and directors ===
Deans and Directors of Education have included:

- Edward F. Buchner, 1909–1929
- Florence E. Bamberger, 1929–1947
- Francis H. Horn, 1947–1951
- Richard A. Mumma, 1951–1970
- Roman J. Verhaalen, 1969–1981
- Stanley C. Gabor, 1982–1999
- Ralph Fessler, 1999–2009
- David W. Andrews, 2010–2016
- Christopher C. Morphew, 2017–2026
- Catherine P. Bradshaw, 2026-present

=== Controversy ===
In 2022, several former students in the school's Counseling program accused the program of discrimination after their dismissals. In response, Dean Christopher Morphew wrote a letter to the JHU News-Letter defending the program and professors named, and asked the News-Letter to retract their article. The situation was covered by Inside Higher Ed in April of 2022.The program had previously lost CACREP accreditation in 2019
