= Tinglong Dai =

American academic

Academic background
- Education: Carnegie Mellon University (PhD, 2013); Hong Kong University of Science and Technology (MPhil, 2006); Tongji University (BEng, 2004)
- Doctoral advisor: Sridhar Tayur; Katia Sycara

Academic work
- Discipline: Operations management Health care analytics Supply chain management
- Institutions: Johns Hopkins University
- Website: carey.jhu.edu/faculty/faculty-directory/tinglong-dai-phd

Tinglong Dai is the Bernard T. Ferrari Professor of Business and Professor of Operations Management and Business Analytics at the Carey Business School, Johns Hopkins University, with expertise in the areas of healthcare analytics, global supply chains, the interfaces between marketing and operations, and human–AI interaction. Dai's research primarily examines the health care ecosystem using analytics approaches, with a focus on behavioral, incentive, and policy issues related to healthcare operations management.

In particular, he has worked extensively on the analysis and design of vaccine supply chains, including influenza vaccine contracting, COVID-19 vaccination, and next-generation vaccine manufacturing. He is considered "one of the nation's foremost experts on vaccine distribution."

== Career ==
Dai earned his B.Eng. in Automation from Tongji University in 2004, MPhil in Industrial Engineering from the Hong Kong University of Science and Technology in 2006, and PhD in Operations Management and Robotics from Carnegie Mellon University in 2013, with Sridhar Tayur and Katia Sycara as his dissertation co-chairs.

Dai joined the faculty of Johns Hopkins in 2013 as an assistant professor at the Carey Business School, was promoted to an associate professor in 2018, and became a tenured full professor in 2021. In 2024, he was named as the inaugural Bernard T. Ferrari Professor of Business.

The business education website Poets & Quants named him one of the World's Best 40 Under 40 Business School Professors. For his multidisciplinary research on healthcare analytics and artificial intelligence, he won the Johns Hopkins Discovery Award three times, in 2015, 2020, and 2022, respectively.

At Johns Hopkins University, Dai holds a joint faculty appointment in the Johns Hopkins School of Nursing. He serves on the leadership team of the university-wide Hopkins Business of Health Initiative and the executive committee of the Institute for Data Intensive Engineering and Science.

He has served on the editorial boards of Manufacturing & Service Operations Management, Production and Operations Management, Naval Research Logistics, and Health Care Management Science.

== Academic work ==
Dai is known for his work in behavioral, incentive, and policy issues in managing healthcare operations. His work has found applications in a variety of settings, most notably in vaccine supply chains, vaccination, organ donation, organ transplantation, diagnostic decision-making, and incorporating AI into healthcare delivery. His research has appeared in leading academic journals, including Management Science, Manufacturing & Service Operations Management, Marketing Science, and Operations Research, and has won First Place in the Production and Operations Management Society's College of Healthcare Operations Management's Best Paper Competition, the INFORMS Public Sector Operations Research Best Paper Award, and the INFORMS Pierskalla Award for Best Paper Award in Healthcare (runner-up), among other best paper awards.

Throughout the COVID-19 pandemic, Dai has written and spoken extensively about the importance of and means to improving the resiliency and transparency of the U.S. personal protective equipment supply chain. According to a 2021 Fortune Magazine article, "Dai has relentlessly advocated for regulations making supply chains more transparent."

Related to the interfaces between marketing and operations, Dai's work is among the first to introduce inventory and supply chain constraints to the study of sales force compensation, through the study of a series of moral-hazard principal–agent problems.

He co-edited (with Sridhar Tayur) the first desk reference on healthcare analytics, Handbook of Healthcare Analytics: Theoretical Minimum for Conducting 21st Century Research on Healthcare Operations, which was published by John Wiley & Sons in 2018.

Dai studied how clinicians perceive physicians who use generative artificial intelligence in medical decision-making. In a 2025 study published in npj Digital Medicine, he and his co-authors found that physicians described as relying on AI received lower competence ratings than those whose descriptions didn't mention AI use. The difference was smaller when AI was used to verify a physician's decisions.

In a 2026 study published in npj Digital Medicine, Dai and his co-authors investigated how financial incentives could influence patients' willingness to use artificial intelligence in healthcare. In hypothetical scenarios, participants were more willing to choose AI-based diabetic eye screening when no copayment was required. Participants who chose AI screening also reported a strong intention to seek confirmation from an eye care professional after an abnormal result.

== Media coverage ==
Dai has been quoted hundreds of times in the popular media, including the Associated Press, Bloomberg News, CNN, Fortune, The New York Times, NPR, USA Today, The Wall Street Journal, and The Washington Post, and has appeared on national and international TV, such as CNBC, PBS NewsHour, and Sky News. In 2021, Poets & Quants named him one of the World's Best 40 Under 40 Business School Professors.

== Publications ==
=== Book ===
- Dai, Tinglong; Tayur, Sridhar, eds. (2018). Handbook of Healthcare Analytics: Theoretical Minimum for Conducting 21st Century Research on Healthcare Operations. John Wiley & Sons, Inc. ISBN 978-1-119-30094-6.

=== Journal publications ===
- Wang, Guihua; Zheng, Ronghuo; Dai, Tinglong (2021-07-09). "Does Transportation Mean Transplantation? Impact of New Airline Routes on Sharing of Cadaveric Kidneys". Management Science. 68 (5): 3660–3679. doi:10.1287/mnsc.2021.4103. S2CID 237797406.
- Dai, Tinglong; Ke, Rongzhu; Ryan, Christopher Thomas (2021). "Incentive Design for Operations-Marketing Multitasking". Management Science. 67 (4): 2211–2230. doi:10.1287/mnsc.2020.3651. S2CID 234602078.
- Dai, Tinglong; Tayur, Sridhar (2020). "OM Forum—Healthcare Operations Management: A Snapshot of Emerging Research". Manufacturing & Service Operations Management. 22 (5): 869–887. doi:10.1287/msom.2019.0778. S2CID 169467315.
- Dai, Tinglong; Zheng, Ronghuo; Sycara, Katia (2020). "Jumping the Line, Charitably: Analysis and Remedy of Donor-Priority Rule". Management Science. 66 (2): 622–641. doi:10.1287/mnsc.2018.3266. S2CID 54028044.
- Dai, Tinglong; Singh, Shubhranshu (2020). "Conspicuous by Its Absence: Diagnostic Expert Testing Under Uncertainty". Marketing Science. 39 (3): 540–563. doi:10.1287/mksc.2019.1201. S2CID 214449699.
- Dai, Tinglong; Jerath, Kinshuk (2019). "Salesforce Contracting Under Uncertain Demand and Supply: Double Moral Hazard and Optimality of Smooth Contracts". Marketing Science. 38 (5): 852–870. doi:10.1287/mksc.2019.1171.
- Dai, Tinglong; Cho, Soo-Haeng; Zhang, Fuqiang (2016). "Contracting for On-Time Delivery in the U.S. Influenza Vaccine Supply Chain". Manufacturing & Service Operations Management. 18 (3): 332–346. doi:10.1287/msom.2015.0574.
- Dai, Tinglong; Jerath, Kinshuk (2013). "Salesforce Compensation with Inventory Considerations". Management Science. 59 (11): 2490–2501. doi:10.1287/mnsc.2013.1809.

=== Book chapters ===
- Dai, Tinglong; Sycara, Katia; Zheng, Ronghuo (2020). "Agent Reasoning in AI-Powered Negotiation". In Kilgour, D. M.; Eden, C. (eds.). Handbook of Group Decision and Negotiation. Cham: Springer International Publishing. pp. 1187–1211. doi:10.1007/978-3-030-12051-1_26-1. ISBN 9783030496289. S2CID 226623047.
- Lee, Soo-Hoon; Dai, Tinglong; Phan, Philip H. (2020-05-16). "Health Organizational Design: Information Exchange and Accountability". Wiley StatsRef: Statistics Reference Online. Wiley. pp. 1–9. doi:10.1002/9781118445112.stat08229. ISBN 9781118445112. S2CID 225847956.
- Dai, Tinglong; Tayur, Sridhar (2017). "The Evolutionary Trends of POM Research in Manufacturing". In Starr, M. K.; Gupta, S. K. (eds.). The Routledge Companion to Production and Operations Management. London, U.K.: Routledge. pp. 647–662. ISBN 9781138919594.
- Turan, Nazli; Dai, Tinglong; Sycara, Katia; Weingart, Laurie (2013). "Toward a Unified Negotiation Framework: Leveraging Strengths in Behavioral and Computational Communities". In Sycara, K.; Gelfand, M.; Abbe (eds.). Models for Intercultural Collaboration and Negotiation. Advances in Group Decision and Negotiation. Vol. 6. Dordrecht: Springer Netherlands. pp. 53–65. doi:10.1007/978-94-007-5574-1_3. ISBN 978-94-007-5573-4. ISSN 1871-935X.
