= Carey Business School =

Graduate business school of Johns Hopkins University

Johns Hopkins Carey Business School
- Type: Private business school
- Established: 2007
- Parent institution: Johns Hopkins University
- Accreditation: AACSB International
- Endowment: More than $50 million
- Dean: Alexander Triantis
- Faculty: 117 full-time
- Postgraduates: 1,258 full-time, 1,103 part-time
- Location: Baltimore, Maryland, United States
- Campus: Urban
- Website: carey.jhu.edu

The Johns Hopkins Carey Business School is the graduate business school of Johns Hopkins University, a private research university in Baltimore, Maryland. It was established in 2007 and offers full-time and part-time programs leading to the Master of Business Administration (MBA) and Master of Science (MS) degrees.

The business school is named after James Carey (1751–1834), a relative of Johns Hopkins. In 2006, sixth-generation descendant William P. Carey, through the W. P. Carey Foundation, donated $50 million to the Johns Hopkins University, contributing to the establishment of the Carey Business School in 2007.

== History ==
The institutional lineage of the programs that later formed the Carey Business School can be traced to Johns Hopkins University's early part-time education programs. The university established its "College Courses for Teachers" in 1909 and began offering evening Courses in Business Economics in 1916. In 1947, the College for Teachers, Night Courses in Technology, and Courses in Business Economics were consolidated into McCoy College, which enrolled many World War II veterans studying under the G.I. Bill. The division later became the School of Continuing Studies and was renamed the School of Professional Studies in Business and Education (SPSBE) in 1999.

The establishment of Carey Business School was engendered by the donation of a $50 million gift by philanthropist William P. Carey to Johns Hopkins University through his W. P. Carey Foundation in 2006, in order to create a business school at the university. To date, this is the largest gift ever made to Johns Hopkins University in support of business education. Following this donation, SPSBE was divided into two independent schools, the Carey Business School and the Johns Hopkins School of Education. The business school is named after William P. Carey's ancestor, James Carey (1751-1834), a Baltimore shipper in the 18th and 19th centuries, chairman of the Bank of Maryland, a member of the Baltimore City Council, and a relative of university founder Johns Hopkins.

Yash Gupta served as the inaugural dean of Carey Business School from 2008 to 2011. In 2010, after the Great Recession ended, Carey Business School launched its full-time Global MBA program. In 2011, Carey Business School relocated to 100 International Drive (formerly known as the Legg Mason Tower) in Inner Harbor East, Baltimore. The business school was originally located on Charles Street.

Carey Business School previously offered an undergraduate program. In 2008, Carey phased out undergraduate freshman and sophomore courses and began offering only two upper-division (junior and senior years only) undergraduate programs, a Bachelor of Science in Business and Management and a Bachelor of Science in Information Systems. Carey primarily targeted non-traditional and transfer undergraduate students. The Bachelor of Business Administration (BBA) program enrolled its last incoming class in fall 2016.

Bernard T. Ferrari served as dean from 2012 to 2019. In 2015, Carey began to offer online classes to serve working professionals and students based in other geographic regions. In 2017, Carey Business School earned accreditation from the Association to Advance Collegiate Schools of Business (AACSB).

In 2019, Alexander Triantis was appointed as the third and current dean of Carey Business School. In 2019, Carey Business School redesigned its full-time Master of Business Administration (MBA) program, succeeding the previous flagship Global MBA program which operated from 2010 to 2019. The redesigned curriculum provides students with more intense experiential learning opportunities and includes courses focusing on artificial intelligence, health care, data analytics, technology, and innovation.

The W. P. Carey Foundation continued its support of the school with a $25 million commitment in 2020 to fund faculty recruitment, academic programs, and student career development. In May 2026, the foundation made an additional $50 million gift, bringing its cumulative contribution for Carey Business School to $125 million. The gift supports the expansion of the school's MBA program, student entrepreneurship initiatives, endowed faculty positions, industry engagement, and its focus on the business of health.

== Locations ==
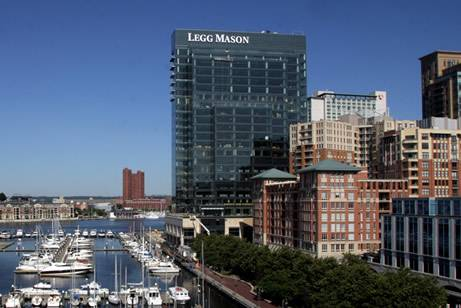
100 International Drive, the home campus of the Johns Hopkins Carey Business School

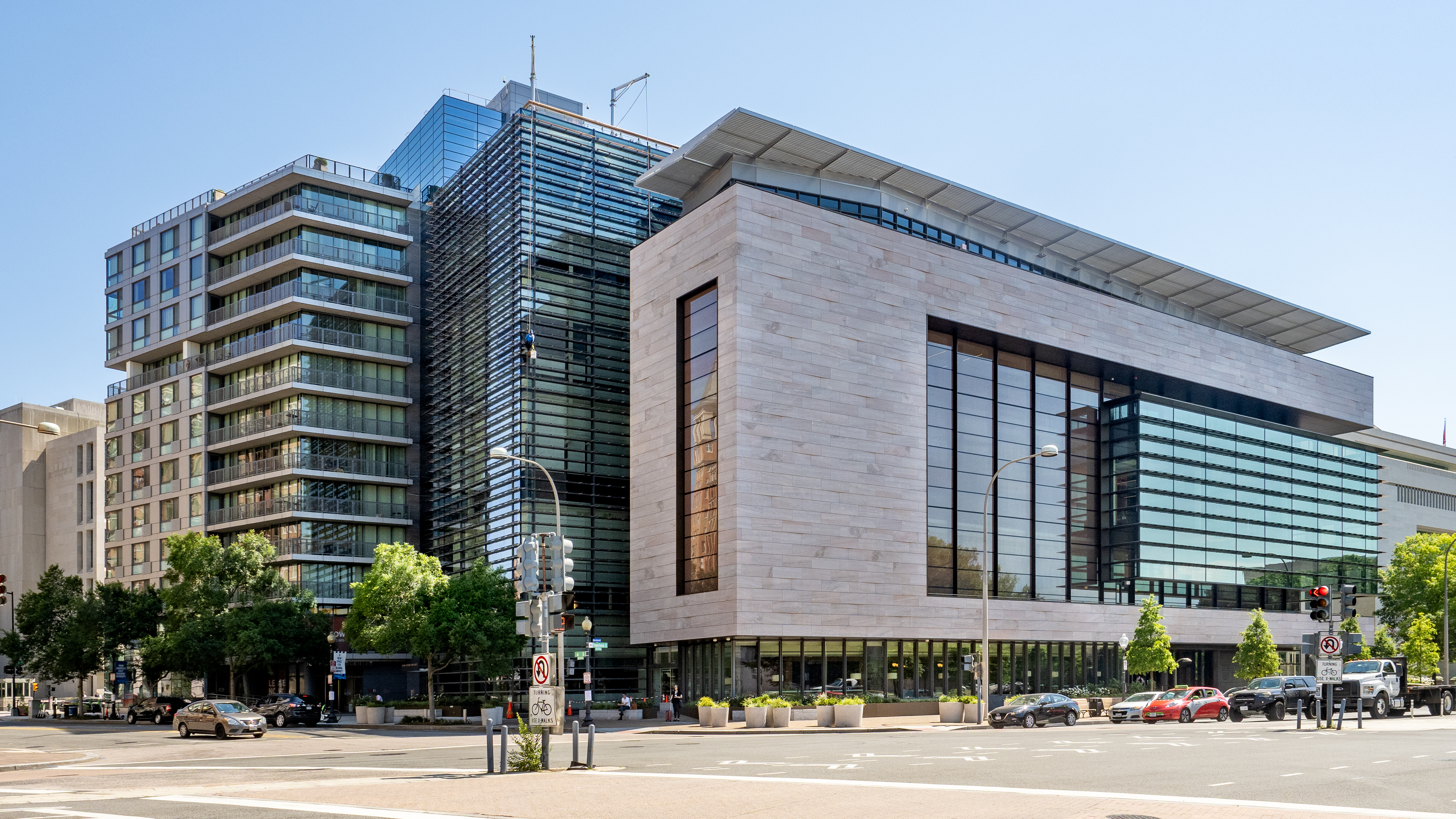
Johns Hopkins University - Bloomberg Center

Carey Business School has two campus locations in the Baltimore–Washington metropolitan area, including:

- The flagship Baltimore campus, located in 100 International Drive in the Inner Harbor East neighborhood (39°16′57.3″N 76°36′05.8″W)
- Washington, D.C. home is the Johns Hopkins University Bloomberg Center at 555 Pennsylvania Avenue NW (formerly the Newseum). Carey Business School shares the space with the Paul H. Nitze School of Advanced International Studies (SAIS) and other Johns Hopkins schools. The new space is designed to facilitate interaction and collaboration among faculty, staff, and students and allow the business school to better provide academic programs and emerging learning modalities.

== Academics ==
The Johns Hopkins Carey Business School is accredited by the Association to Advance Collegiate Schools of Business (AACSB) and Middle States Commission on Higher Education (MSCHE).

Carey Business School launched its full-time Master of Business Administration (MBA) program in 2010. In 2019, Carey Business School redesigned its full-time MBA program, replacing the previous flagship Global MBA program which operated from 2010 to 2019. The revamped curriculum increases experiential learning opportunities for students and includes courses focusing on health care, data analysis, technology, and innovation.

Key components of the program include the Big Data Consulting Project where students partner with leading companies to gain practical experience in analyzing a data set related to a business challenge. The Innovation Field Project places students on-site with partner organizations across different industries and sectors throughout the country. MBA students can also specialize in Health, Technology, and Innovation specialization, which capitalizes on Johns Hopkins world-renowned leadership in medicine, nursing, public health, and advanced biotechnology. The MBA achieved STEM designation in 2023.

Carey Business School offers a part-time Flexible MBA program, which may be completed by mostly online classes. The Flexible MBA program consists of 54 credits, of which 20 are required Business Foundation courses, and now offers eight curricular specializations. Carey began offering online classes since 2015 to serve working professionals and students based in other geographic regions.

Aside from MBA programs, Carey Business School offers Master of Science (MS) degree programs in several business specializations in full-time and part-time formats. Master's students, upon completing their degrees at Carey Business School, also have the option of earning an MBA by completing additional courses.

== Research ==
The Carey Business School is home to a number of interdisciplinary research centers and initiatives spanning health care, artificial intelligence, leadership, human capital, technology, and public policy.

- The Center for Digital Health and Artificial Intelligence conducts research at the intersection of digital technologies, analytics, artificial intelligence, and health care.
- The Center for Innovative Leadership conducts research on leadership and develops evidence-based resources and educational programs for leaders and organizations.
- The Human Capital Development Lab conducts interdisciplinary research on human capital, including artificial intelligence and human collaboration, employee well-being, organizational culture, workforce skills, and human capital sustainability.
- The Gender & Work Initiative studies the organizational and structural factors contributing to gender inequality in workplaces and labor markets and develops evidence-based approaches to workplace equity.
- The Technology and Society Initiative studies the social impact of emerging technologies, including how business decisions, public policy, and consumer behavior influence the benefits and risks associated with digital platforms and artificial intelligence.
- The Hopkins Business of Health Initiative is an interdisciplinary research initiative involving the Carey Business School, the Johns Hopkins Bloomberg School of Public Health, the Johns Hopkins School of Medicine, and the Johns Hopkins School of Nursing. Its research focuses on the role of business, incentives, and policy in improving health care access, affordability, and outcomes.
- The Center for Health Systems and Policy Modeling develops empirical and predictive models of the U.S. health care system to study how incentives, institutional structures, and public policy affect health care delivery, costs, and outcomes.

== Rankings ==
Business school rankings

Global
- QS MBA: 50
- Financial Times MBA: Unranked

In the 2027 QS Business Master's Rankings, published in September 2026, Carey Business School's MS in Marketing was ranked No. 27 worldwide. In the 2027 QS Global MBA Rankings, Carey's full-time MBA was ranked No. 19 in the United States and No. 50 worldwide.

Carey Business School has not participated in, nor been ranked by U.S. News & World Report, Financial Times, and Bloomberg Businessweek.

== Publications ==
The business school publishes Changing Business a quarterly e-newsletter highlighting faculty research.

== Notable people ==
=== Faculty ===
- Ritu Agarwal - Wm. Polk Carey Distinguished Professor of Information Systems
- Melinda Beeuwkes Buntin - Bloomberg Distinguished Professor of Economics and Health
- Maqbool Dada - Professor of Operations Management
- Tinglong Dai - Bernard T. Ferrari Professor of Business; Professor of Operations Management and Business Analytics
- Frank J. Fabozzi - Professor of Finance
- Paul J. Ferraro - Bloomberg Distinguished Professor of Business and Engineering
- Michael Keane (economist) - Wm. Polk Carey Distinguished Professor in Economics and Marketing
- Sunil Kumar - Current President of Tufts University, former Professor of Operations Management and Business Analytics; Former Provost and Senior Vice President for Academic Affairs at Johns Hopkins University
- Marty Makary - Mark Ravitch Chair in Gastrointestinal Surgery at Johns Hopkins School of Medicine; Professor of Surgery and Public Health at the Johns Hopkins Bloomberg School of Public Health; Professor at Carey Business School
- Phillip Phan - Alonzo and Virginia Decker Professor of Strategy and Entrepreneurship
- Daniel Polsky - Bloomberg Distinguished Professor of Health Policy and Economics
- Kathleen M. Sutcliffe - Bloomberg Distinguished Professor of Business and Medicine

==== Leadership ====
- Alexander Triantis - Current dean since 2019, former dean of Robert H. Smith School of Business at the University of Maryland, College Park (2013–2019).
- Bernard T. Ferrari - Dean from 2012 until 2019
- Yash Gupta - Dean from 2008 until 2011, former dean of USC Marshall School of Business (2004–2006) and University of Washington Foster School of Business (1999–2004), and University of Colorado Denver Business School (1992–1999).

=== Alumni ===
- Obafemi Ayanbadejo (MBA '13) - former American football fullback
- Ken Babby (MBA) - Owner, Akron RubberDucks and Jacksonville Jumbo Shrimp
- Matthew E. Bershadker (MBA) - President and CEO, American Society for the Prevention of Cruelty to Animals
- Candy Carson (MAS) - Violinist; wife of Ben Carson
- William J. Frank (MAS '92) member of Maryland House of Delegates
- Douglas Jabs (MBA '98) - CEO of the Mount Sinai Faculty Practice Associates, Dean for Clinical Affairs; Professor and Chair of the Department of Ophthalmology and Professor of Medicine of The Mount Sinai School of Medicine in New York City
- Alvin B. Jackson (MBA) - former member of Utah State Senate
- J.D. Kleinke (MBA) - American entrepreneur, writer, and thought leader in the health care industry
- Andrea Leand (MBA '02) - professional tennis player
- George David Low (MBA)- American aerospace executive and a NASA astronaut
- Patrick Maggitti, PhD (MBA '02), first Provost of Villanova University, former Dean of the Villanova School of Business
- Alexandra Miller (MBA '09) - Republican politician and businesswoman
- Myechia Minter-Jordan (MBA '07) - CEO of AARP
- John Morlu - former Auditor-General of Republic of Liberia
- Morgan Ortagus (MBA '13) - Spokesperson for the U.S. Department of State
- Karen Peetz (MS '81) - former President, BNY Mellon; No.1 "Most Powerful Women in Banking"
- Griffin P. Rodgers (MBA '05) - Director of National Institute of Diabetes and Digestive and Kidney Diseases; Chief of NIH's Molecular and Clinical Hematology Branch; known for contributions to research and therapy for sickle cell anemia
- Leslie Sanchez (MBA) - Author of Los Republicanos: Why Hispanics and Republicans Need Each Other; 100 Most Influential Hispanic Americans
- Laurence Shanet (ASC in Marketing Communications) - Film director
- Peter Staats (MBA '04) - American physician, educator, author, inventor and clinical researcher, specializing in interventional pain medicine; founder of the Division of Pain Medicine at the Johns Hopkins School of Medicine

== See also ==
- Johns Hopkins University
- List of business schools in the United States
- List of Johns Hopkins University people in business
- Business School
