= Maxime Cohen =

Canadian scientist

Maxime C. Cohen
- Education: Technion – Israel Institute of Technology; Massachusetts Institute of Technology
- Occupations: professor, researcher, author
- Awards: MSOM Young Scholar Prize (2022); Poets&Quants Best 40-Under-40 MBA Professors (2022); MIT Energy Initiative Fellowship; POMS Wickham Skinner Early-Career Research Accomplishments Award (2020)
- Scientific career
- Workplaces: McGill University; New York University Stern School of Business

Maxime C. Cohen is a Professor of Retail and Operations Management and the Academic Director of the Bensadoun School of Retail Management at McGill University in Montreal, Quebec, Canada. Previously, he was the Director of Research at the Bensadoun School of Retail Management at McGill University. He holds the title of Scale AI Chair in Data science for Retail.

== Education and career ==
Cohen did his PhD in Operations Research from the Massachusetts Institute of Technology. He completed his Master of Science in Electrical Engineering and a Bachelor of Science in Aerospace Engineering from the Technion – Israel Institute of Technology. His research interests are in data science, AI technologies, empirical and behavioral operations management, field experiments, online marketplaces, pricing and revenue management, and retail.

Cohen was appointed as Chief of AI Strategy at the CIUSSS West-Central Montreal in December 2024. Prior to this, he was appointed as the first Chief Artificial Intelligence Officer (CAIO) at ELNA Medical, Canada's largest integrated network of medical clinics. He was also a visiting professor and Shubik Fellow at Yale School of Management in 2023–2024. Before joining the faculty at McGill University, Cohen was an assistant professor of technology, operations, and statistics at the NYU Stern School of Business. He also worked as a research scientist at Google AI.

He has co-authored several books and published numerous academic papers in leading journals, including Harvard Business Review, Information Systems Research, Management Science, Marketing Science, MIT Sloan Management Review, etc. He worked extensively on pricing optimization and on demand prediction. In 2022, he co-authored a book titled Demand Prediction in Retail that was published by Springer. In September 2024, he authored the AI is Good for Us white paper highlighting the benefits and positive impacts of AI on humanity and society.

== Honours ==
- Top Retail Influencer, RETHINK Retail (2024).
- MSOM Young Scholar Prize (2022).
- Named to Poets&Quants' annual Best 40-Under-40 MBA Professors list (2022).
- CIST Best Conference Paper Nomination Award (2021).
- POMS Wickham Skinner Early-Career Research Accomplishments Award (2020).
- First place in the Best OM Paper in Management Science Award (2019).
- UPS PhD Fellowship (2014–2015).
- Best Application of Theory award from the 2015 NEDSI Conference.
- MIT Energy Initiative Fellowship (2011–2012).
