= Tactician Corporation =

- Formerly: Tactics International Ltd.
- Type: Private
- Industry: Computer Software; Geographic Information Systems (GIS)
- Founded: 1988 in Andover, Massachusetts
- Founder: Tony Buxton
- Headquarters: Andover, Massachusetts
- Website: tactician.com

Tactician Corporation is a developer and provider of GIS desktop software, SaaS web software, and business intelligence consulting services internationally. The company has its headquarters in Massachusetts, United States.

== History ==
=== 1974–1988: Australia ===
In 1974, Tony Buxton co-founded the Australia Planning and Systems Company (APASCO) in Sydney.

In 1979, APASCO worked with the government agency, Commonwealth Scientific and Industrial Research Organisation (CSIRO), to create COLOURMAP, an interactive color mapping system. A few years later, APASCO would add site location and territory assignment capabilities for their product, APASCOMAP.

In 1986, APASCO added operations in the US under the name TACTICS (an acronym for The Australian Customer Target Information Company).

=== 1988–1989: Founding of Tactics International ===
On December 6, 1988, based on the foundational work with TACTICS, Buxton incorporated the US-based Tactics International Limited in Andover, Massachusetts. Tactics would develop the FASTMAP product for the VAX, one of the first GIS products for the VAX/VMS platform.

=== 1990–1993: Tactician for Macintosh, OS/2, and DEC ===
In 1990, Tactics released its first Macintosh-based version of the desktop GIS software product, Tactician. That year, the Tactician software would go on to win the 1990 MacUser "Eddy" Editor's Choice Award for Best Executive Information System.

Also in 1990, Tactician UK was founded (later named Geoplan Spatial Intelligence Ltd.) as the exclusive UK partner and reseller of Tactics International products.

Tactician 2.0 was released in 1991 with the ability to access SQL databases with Apple's Data Access Language.

In 1992, the Tactician Buttons proprietary scripting language was created to help automate processes with Tactician, and that year Tactician was ported to Microsoft Windows 3.0 as well as the IBM OS/2 platforms.

In 1993, Tactician 3.0 was released with additional Selling Machine and Micro-Marketing Machine models to automate analyses. Also that same year, the Tactician desktop program was ported to the DEC Alpha AXP.

=== 1994–2003: Tactician Corporation, TacticianOne, MapScape.com and Giken Shoji International ===
Tactics International Ltd. was renamed to Tactician Corporation in 1994. In that same year, a partnership was created with the Japanese company, Giken Shoji International, to release the desktop software Tactician 3.1 in Japan.

In 1995, Tactician Corporation was awarded a mapping contract with the FDIC to create the Tactician CRA Analyzer product. Based on the Tactician engine, the CRA Analyzer allowed FDIC bank examiners and banks themselves to analyze bank compliance with the Community Reinvestment Act (CRA) and other fair lending laws and regulations using census and summarized HMDA data. Also that year, Tactician signed Maptel as their Spanish distributor of business GIS solutions.

Also in 1995 Giken Shoji International released the first Japanese version of Tactician fully translated for the Japanese language.

Tactician Corporation released the new Tactician 4.0 in 1996. Also in 1996, Tactician created the SITE-AMERICA target marketing and site analysis product.

In 1996, Giken Shoji International released the Tactician-based 'Targeting Machine', a Trade Area Analysis GIS for Japan.

In 1997, Giken Shoji International invested in Tactician Corporation to build a closer relationship with Tactician Corporation. This was followed in 1998 by the establishment of a joint R&D Branch in Boston, MA. that included Giken Shoji staff from Japan.

TacticianOne was released in 1998 as a newly redesigned and faster desktop software program that was created to update and replace the previous Tactician 5.

In 1999, Tactician Corporation created one of the first GIS SaaS systems at MapScape.com. It was based on the TacticianOne engine for web-based site reporting and geomarketing that could be accessed from any computer. Also in 1999, Tactician formed a partnership with ADVO (later purchased by Valassis in 2007) to create the Targeter EXPRESS software for creating advertising campaigns and planning new site locations.

In 2001, Tactician Corporation and Giken Shoji International established a joint Development Center in Sydney, Australia to develop new technologies in the geo-marketing space including internet based solutions.

A new company, Tactician Media, was formed in 2001 as an affiliated, partially owned company of Tactician Corporation to break into the field of planning and placement of print media advertising. To this end, they created the Insert Express front-end for newspaper advertising, and they also created Tactician Direct for solo and direct mail marketing, both of which were based on the Tactician web interface and engine.

Tactician established an agreement in 2002 with Pathfinder Solutions (Australia) to resell the TacticianOne desktop software.

In 2003, Geografia de Mercado partnered with Tactician to distribute their products and launch a Tactician website in Brazil.

=== 2004–2021: Tactician Online ===
In 2004 Tactician Corporation and Giken Shoji International released their internet based geo-marketing solutions, resulting from the collaboration of the joint Sydney Development Center.

In 2004, MapScape.com was rebranded as Tactician Online, now accessible at Tactician.com. In May 2004, Tactician announced that they had partnered with Keyhole to overlay their maps on the 3D earth-based application, Keyhole PRO, and after Keyhole was acquired the next year by Google, this product would become Google Earth. Later in the year, in September 2004, Rand McNally launched its first online commercial atlas powered by the Tactician Online engine.

In 2005, Longitudes Group started reselling Tactician products and services as a golf and outdoor sporting solution provider. Additionally, the National Golf Foundation (NGF) partnered with Tactician that same year to create a Golf Demand Model which incorporated NGF datasets to assist with retail selection, market potential, and territory analysis.

Also in 2005, Tactician partnered with MapData Sciences (later renamed to MapData Services) to create an Australia and a New Zealand online portal using the Tactician Online mapping interface for users and companies interested in the AU or NZ markets.

In 2006, Indicia Geomarketing partnered with Tactician Corporation to become the exclusive reseller of all Tactician technology in Canada.

In 2008, Tactician and Valassis jointly created the IMO (Integrated Media Optimization) product using the Tactician Online mapping engine that allowed them to select geographies for media planning, and they also offer that product as a service. Also that year, Tactician formed a partnership with Kitelab Argentina for them to be the reseller of the TacticianOne and Tactician Online software.

Tactician partnered in 2009 with Decision Data Resources to create their Research360 online product, utilizing the Tactician Online engine. In that same year, Tactician also partnered with Geographic Enterprises to create the GeoMetrx online product, which also used the Tactician Online interface, to target franchise territory analysis.

In 2010, Deloitte Australia bought Pathfinder Solutions and incorporated it into the Deloitte Analytics division, where they became a reseller of the TacticianOne desktop software and solutions. Also in 2010, Tactician partnered with Synygy, a sales performance management solution provider, to offer Tactician's products and services for sales territory alignment. Additionally that year, Tactician partnered with Health Market Science (HMS) to become a Tactician reseller. Tactician would later develop the mapping portion, based on the Tactician Online engine, of the HMS product, MarketView, a healthcare practitioner and facility analysis service.

In 2011, Tactician and Cogito Software NA, later named AlignOps LLC, entered into a partnership where they would resell Tactician products and territory optimization solutions.

In April 2013, Tactician, in conjunction with Decision Data Resources (DDR) and the Texas Workforce Commission (TWC), in partnership with Texas A&M Engineering Extension Service (TEEX), released a branded version of the Tactician Online system, SitesOnTexas 2.0 (SOTv2.0), an online planning and business development tool for Texas government agencies. It is in use by all 28 of the Texas Workforce Boards, the Texas Governor's Office, and many Chambers of Commerce and higher education institutions.

In 2018 Tactician Corporation and Giken Shoji International jointly managed and released a 64-bit conversion of the Tactician One GIS engine.

=== 2022–Present: Tactician Cloud ===
In June 2022, Tactician Cloud replaced Tactician Online, now accessible at Tactician.com.

== Awards ==
- 1990 MacUser Editor's Choice Award: Best executive information system product: Tactician.
- 1995 Best 100 Award, Sources for Marketing Information, American Demographics Magazine.

== See also ==
- Decision support system
- Executive information system
- Geoinformatics
- Geographic information system
- Market analysis
- Marketing strategy
- Micromarketing
- Sales territory
- Spatial analysis
