= Maqbool Dada =

Professor of business and management

Academic background
- Education: University of California, Berkeley (BS, 1978); MIT Sloan School of Management (PhD, 1984)

Academic work
- Discipline: Operations Management; Healthcare; Marketing
- Institutions: Johns Hopkins University; Purdue University; Northwestern University

Maqbool Dada is a professor at Carey Business School, Johns Hopkins University, with expertise in the areas of operations management, healthcare, and marketing. He is also a core faculty member at the Johns Hopkins School of Medicine’s Armstrong Institute for Patient Safety and Quality.

At the Johns Hopkins Department of Anesthesiology and Critical Care Medicine, Dada is Co-Director of the Medical Operations Research Core, which is dedicated to "innovation in development of care delivery models that improve patient access, patient flow, safety and clinical operational efficiency using tools of operations research and industrial engineering."

== Career ==
Maqbool Dada earned his BS in industrial engineering and operations research from the University of California, Berkeley, in 1978 and a PhD in operations management from the MIT Sloan School of Management in 1984. Prior to joining Johns Hopkins University in 2009, Dada served as Professor of Management at Krannert School of Management, Purdue University and served as the chairman of the Operations Management area between 1998 and 2008. He was also on the faculty of Kellogg School of Management, Northwestern University, University of Chicago Booth School of Business, and University of Illinois at Chicago. He served as Associate Dean for full-time programs at the Carey Business School in 2009 and is a core faculty member at the Johns Hopkins Armstrong Institute for Patient Safety and Quality. In addition, Dada is co-director of the Medical Operations Research Core at the Johns Hopkins School of Medicine.

== Academic work ==
Dada is known for his work in supply chain management, pricing, inventory theory, and healthcare. He serves or has served on the editorial board of major operations management journals, including Management Science, Manufacturing & Service Operations Management, IISE Transactions, and Productions and Operations Management.

His research paper entitled "Pricing and the Newsvendor Problem" published in 1999, is the No.1 most read article and the No. 7 most cited in the Operations Research journal, and has been cited more than 1,700 times as of October 2019.

Another paper co-authored by Dada, entitled "A newsvendor’s Procurement Problem when Suppliers Are Unreliable" and published in 2007, is the No. 3 most cited article in the Manufacturing & Service Operations Management journal.

== Areas of research ==
=== Operations strategy ===
Dada's research covers various aspects of operations strategy, in particular, pricing, postponement, and learning. His papers "Pricing and the Newsvendor Problem: A Review with Extensions" and "Price Versus Production Postponement: Capacity and Competition" are among the most cited papers on operations strategy.

His 2007 paper "A Newsvendor's Procurement Problem When Suppliers are Unreliable," published in Manufacturing & Service Operations Management, was selected as a finalist for the 2010 Manufacturing & Service Operations Management Best Paper Award. The same paper has been recognized as one of the most cited papers ever published in the journal, according to a 2019 survey paper by Gerard Cachon, Karan Girotra, and Serguei Netessine.

=== Healthcare ===
Dada's research in healthcare initially focused on reimbursement policy, for example, on Medicare prospective payment system, and later shifted toward applications of Operations Management to healthcare delivery. He has also worked on global health issues, including, for example, expanding capacity in women's reproductive health care in Sierra Leone to reduce maternal morbidity and mortality, supported by an Alliance for a Healthier World at Johns Hopkins Award.

=== Marketing-operations interfaces ===
Dada is among the pioneering researchers in the field of marketing-operations interfaces. In this area, his research covers various topics including durable goods, demand substitution, distribution and pricing, and consumers' waiting experience.

== Publications ==
According to Google Scholar, as of October 2019, Dada's ten most widely cited papers are:

- Petruzzi, Nicholas C.; Dada, Maqbool (1999). "Pricing and the Newsvendor Problem: A Review with Extensions". Operations Research. 47 (2): 183–194. doi:10.1287/opre.47.2.183.
- Dada, Maqbool; Petruzzi, Nicholas C.; Schwarz, Leroy B. (2007). "A Newsvendor's Procurement Problem when Suppliers Are Unreliable". Manufacturing & Service Operations Management. 9 (1): 9–32. doi:10.1287/msom.1060.0128. S2CID 207235834.
- Van Mieghem, Jan A.; Dada, Maqbool (1999). "Price Versus Production Postponement: Capacity and Competition". Management Science. 45 (12): 1639–1649. doi:10.1287/mnsc.45.12.1631.
- Dada, Maqbool; Hu, Qiaohai (2008). "Financing Newsvendor Inventory". Operations Research Letters. 36 (5): 569–573. doi:10.1016/j.orl.2008.06.004.
- Anupindi, Ravi; Dada, Maqbool; Gupta, Sachin (1998). "Estimation of Consumer Demand with Stock-Out Based Substitution: An Application to Vending Machine Products". Marketing Science. 17 (4): 406–423. doi:10.1287/mksc.17.4.406. S2CID 11767464.
- Kumar, Piyush; Kalwani, Manohar U.; Dada, Maqbool (1997). "The Impact of Waiting Time Guarantees on Customers' Waiting Experiences". Marketing Science. 16 (4): 295–314. doi:10.1287/mksc.16.4.295. S2CID 14540267.
- Serel, Dogan A.; Dada, Maqbool; Moskowitz, Herbert (2001). "Sourcing Decisions with Capacity Reservation Contracts". European Journal of Operational Research. 131 (3): 635–648. doi:10.1016/S0377-2217(00)00106-5. hdl:11693/24850.
- Dada, Maqbool; Srikanth, K. N. (1987). "Pricing Policies for Quantity Discounts". Management Science. 33 (10): 1247–1252. doi:10.1287/mnsc.33.10.1247.
- Chopra, Sunil; Reinhardt, Gilles; Dada, Maqbool (2004). "The Effect of Lead Time Uncertainty on Safety Stocks". Decision Sciences. 35 (1): 1–24. doi:10.1111/j.1540-5414.2004.02332.x.
- Kazaz, Burak; Dada, Maqbool; Moskowitz, Herbert (2005). "Global Production Planning Under Exchange-Rate Uncertainty". Management Science. 51 (7): 1101–1119. doi:10.1287/mnsc.1050.0384.
