= Carey Institute for Global Good =

American nonprofit organization

- Formation: 1924
- Type: Nonprofit
- Purpose: Humanitarian issues
- Location: 63 Huyck Road, Rensselaerville, NY 12147
- Website: careyinstitute.org

The Carey Institute for Global Good is an independent American nonprofit organization whose mission is to make a "better world by contributing to a strong, educated, and just society." Through its programs in nonfiction, sustainable communities, arts and music, and education, the Institute strives to bring together innovative and dynamic people from around the world to seek creative solutions to the most pressing challenges of the day.

The Institute is located on a 100-acre estate in Rensselaerville, New York, and the estate has a long history of social engagement and continues to host meetings, conferences, and events. Businessman William P. Carey bought the estate in 2011 and founded the Carey Institute for Global Good.

== History ==
The roots of the Carey Institute go back to 1924, when Laura Talmage Huyck convened "Country Forums on Human Relations" at her home as a reaction to the carnage of World War I. The forums aimed to promote global understanding that would lead to peaceful resolutions of differences. Participants came from many countries to discuss how to achieve world peace and mutual understanding.

In 1963, the Institute on Man and Science was founded, re-establishing these fora to promote world peace. The campus in Rensselaerville would later hold meetings of international diplomats convened by UN Secretary General U Thant.

When William P. Carey purchased the campus in 2012, his dream was to re-establish the original spirit of dynamic inquiry to empower people to make informed decisions that can create meaningful change in the world.

== Location ==
The Institute is located on a 100-acre estate in Rensselaerville, New York. The estate overlooks Lake Myosotis and includes five residences and a gourmet restaurant.
