= Health care analytics =

Health care analytics is the health care analysis activities that can be undertaken as a result of data collected from four areas within healthcare: (1) claims and cost data, (2) pharmaceutical and research and development (R&D) data, (3) clinical data (such as collected from electronic medical records (EHRs)), and (4) patient behaviors and preferences data (e.g. patient satisfaction or retail purchases, such as data captured in stores selling personal health products). Health care analytics is a growing industry in many countries including the United States, where it is expected to grow to more than $31 billion by 2022. It is also increasingly important to governments and public health agencies to support health policy and meet public expectations for transparency, as accelerated by the COVID-19 pandemic.

Health care analytics allows for the examination of patterns in various healthcare data in order to determine how clinical care can be improved for patients and provider teams, while limiting excessive spending and improving the health of populations. Areas of the industry focuses on clinical analysis, financial analysis, supply chain analysis, as well as marketing, fraud and HR analysis. There is increasing demand in many countries to incorporate social indicators of patients and providers within health care analytics, to inform improvements for health equity, such as in terms of addressing racism in healthcare or the health of Indigenous peoples.

== Balancing Interests in Healthcare Analytics: innovation, privacy, and patient safety ==
Healthcare analytics requires access to comprehensive data, but its usefulness depends on a balance between expansive limits on the collection of data that may risk the protection for patient rights, erroneous conclusions or statistical predictions, and misuse of results. Appropriate policies could support gains in process improvements, cost reductions, personalized medicine, and population health. Additionally, providing incentives to encourage appropriate use may address some concerns but could also inadvertently incentivize the misuse of data. Lastly, creating standards for IT infrastructure may encourage data sharing and use, but those standards would need to be reevaluated on a regular, ongoing basis as the fast pace of technological innovation causes standards and best practices to become quickly outdated.

Several areas to improve healthcare analytics through national, regional and local collaborations and legislation have been identified.

=== Limiting data collection ===
The needs of healthcare providers, government agencies, health plans, and researchers for quality data must be met to ensure adequate medical care and to make improvements to the healthcare system, while still ensuring the patients right to privacy. Data collection should be limited to necessity for medical care and by patient preference beyond that care. Such limits would protect patient privacy while minimizing infrastructure costs to house data. When possible, patients should be informed about what data is collected prior to engaging in medical services. For instance in Canada, data collection among Indigenous populations is governed by principles of First Nations ownership, control, access, and possession.

=== Limiting data use ===
Expanding availability of big data increases the risk of statistical errors, erroneous conclusions and predictions, and misuse of results. Evidence supports use of data for process improvements, cost reductions, personalized medicine, and public health. Innovative uses for individual health can harm underserved populations. In the United States, limiting use for denial and exclusion prevents use to determine eligibility for benefits or care and is harmonized with other federal anti-discrimination laws, such as Fair Credit Reporting Act, and is harmonized with anti-discrimination laws like the Civil Rights Act and the Genetic Information Nondiscrimination Act.

=== Providing incentives to encourage appropriate use ===
Increasing vertical integration in both public and private sector providers has created massive databases of electronic health records. In the United States, the ACA has provided Medicare and Medicaid incentives to providers to adopt EHR's. Large healthcare institutions also have internal motivation to apply healthcare analytics, largely for reducing costs by providing preventative care. Policy could increase data use by incentivizing insurers and providers to increase population tracking, which improves outcomes.

=== Creating standards for the IT infrastructure ===
Inappropriate IT infrastructure likely limits healthcare analytics findings and their impact on clinical practice. Establishing standards ensures IT infrastructure capable of housing big data balanced with addressing accessibility, ownership, and privacy. New possibilities could be explored such as private clouds and “a virtual sandbox” consisting of filtered data authorized to the researchers accessing the sandbox. Standards promote easier coordination in information collaboration between different medical and research organizations resulting in significantly improving patient care by improving communication between providers and reducing duplicity and costs.

Minimum standards are necessary to balance privacy and accessibility. Standardization helps improve patient care by facilitating research collaboration and easier communication between medical providers. The research can yield preventive care concepts that can reduce patient caseload and avoid long-term medical costs.

== Healthcare analytics in UAE ==
The Dubai Pharmacy College (DPCG) is a pioneer in healthcare data analytics education in the GCC region. DPC offers a Post-graduate certificate course in "Healthcare business data analytics" for healthcare professionals to motivate the intuition to explore the concept of healthcare data analytics and apply innovations in healthcare computing technologies. The aim of the certification program is to provide a platform for interprofessional researchers to utilize the fundamental technology including software applications for intelligent data acquisition, processing, and analysis of healthcare data.

== Healthcare analytics in the United States ==
=== Federal government role in health IT ===
In the United States, multiple federal entities are heavily involved in health analytics infrastructure. Within the executive branch, the administration itself, Centers for Medicare and Medicaid Services (CMS), and Office of the National Coordinator for Health Information Technology (ONC) each have strategic plans and are involved in determining regulation. Within the legislative branch, multiple committees within the House of Representatives and Senate hold hearings and have opinions on using data and technology to reduce costs and improve outcomes in healthcare.

The ONC issued the Federal Health IT Strategic Plan 2015-2020. The plan outlines the steps federal agencies will take to achieve widespread use of health information technology (health IT) and electronic health information to enhance the health IT infrastructure, to advance person-centered and self-managed health, to transform health care delivery and community health, and to foster research, scientific knowledge and innovation. The plan is intended “to provide clarity in federal policies, programs, and actions and includes strategies to align program requirements, harmonize and simplify regulations, and aims to help health IT users to advance the learning health system to achieve better health.”

The Strategic Plan includes several key initiatives employing multiple strategies to meet its goals. These include: (1) finalizing and implementing an interoperability roadmap; (2) protecting the privacy and security of health information; (3) identifying, prioritizing and advancing technical standards; (4) increasing user and market confidence in the safety and safe use of health IT; (5) advancing a national communication infrastructure; and (6) collaborating among all stakeholders.

=== Challenges to address ===
==== Creating an interoperability roadmap ====
Dr.Aryan Chavan challenges to be addressed: (1) variation in how standards are tested and implemented; (2) variation in how health IT stakeholders interpret and implement policies and legal requirements; and (3) reluctance of health IT stakeholders to share and collaborate in ways that might foster consumer engagement.

The ONC is working to develop a policy advisory for health information exchange by 2017 that will define and outline basic expectations for trading partners around health information exchange, interoperability and the exchange of information. Current federal and state law only prohibits certain kinds of information blocking in limited and narrow circumstances, for example, under the Health Insurance Portability and Accountability Act (HIPAA) or the Anti-Kickback statute.

==== Protecting privacy and security ====
In addition to HIPAA, many states have their own privacy laws protecting an individual’s health information. State laws that are contrary to HIPAA are generally preempted by the federal requirements unless a specific exception applies. For example, if the state law relates to identifiable health information and provides greater privacy protections, then it is not preempted by HIPAA. Since privacy laws may vary from state-to-state, it may create confusion among health IT stakeholders and make it difficult to ensure privacy compliance.

==== Establishing common technical standards ====
Use of common technical standards is necessary to move electronic health information seamlessly and securely. While some clinical record content, such as laboratory results and clinical measurements are easily standardized other content, such as provider notes may be more difficult to standardize. Methods need to be identified that allow for the standardization of provider notes and other traditionally “free form text” data.

The ONC HIT Certification Program certifies that a system meets the technological capability, functionality and security requirements adopted by HHS. ONC will assess the program on an ongoing basis “to ensure it can address and reinforce health IT applications and requirements that support federal value-based and alternative payment models.”

==== Increasing confidence in safety and safe use of health IT ====
Health care consumers, providers and organizations need to feel confident that the health IT products, systems or services they are using are not only secure, safe and useful but that they can switch between products, systems or services without loss of valuable information or undue financial burden. Implementation of the Federal Health IT Strategic Plan 2015-2020, along with the 2013 HHS Health IT Patient Safety Action and Surveillance Plan and 2012 Food and Drug Administration Safety and Innovation Act will attempt to address these concerns.

==== Developing national communications structure ====
A national communications infrastructure is necessary to enable the sharing of electronic health information between stakeholders, including providers, individuals and national emergency first responders. It is also necessary for delivering telehealth services or using mobile health applications. “Expanded, secure, and affordable high-speed wireless and broadband services, choice, and spectrum availability will support electronic health information sharing and use, support the communication required for care delivery, and support the continuity of health care and public health services during disasters and public health emergencies.”

==== Stakeholder collaboration ====
The federal government in its role as contributor, beneficiary and collaborator “aims to encourage private-sector innovators and entrepreneurs, as well as researchers, to use government and government-funded data to create useful applications, products, services, and features that help improve health and health care.” HHS receives funds from the Patient-Centered Outcomes Research Trust Fund to build data capacity for patient-centered outcomes research. It is estimated HHS will receive over $140 million for the period between 2011 and 2019. These funds will be used “to enable a comprehensive, interoperable, and sustainable data network infrastructure to collect, link, and analyze data from multiple sources to facilitate patient-centered outcomes research.”

==== Legislation ====
Meaningful Use, the Patient Protection and Affordable Care Act (ACA) and the declining cost of data storage results in health data being stored, shared, and used by multiple providers, insurance companies, and research institutions. Concerns exist about how organizations gather, store, share, and use personal information, including privacy and confidentiality concerns, as well as the concerns over the quality and accuracy of data collected. Expansion of existing regulation can ensure patient privacy and guard patient safety to balance access to data and the ethical impact of exposing that data.

== See also ==
- health information management
- health informatics
- public health informatics
- human resources for health information systems (HRHIS)
