= Ritu Agarwal =

Indian-American management scientist

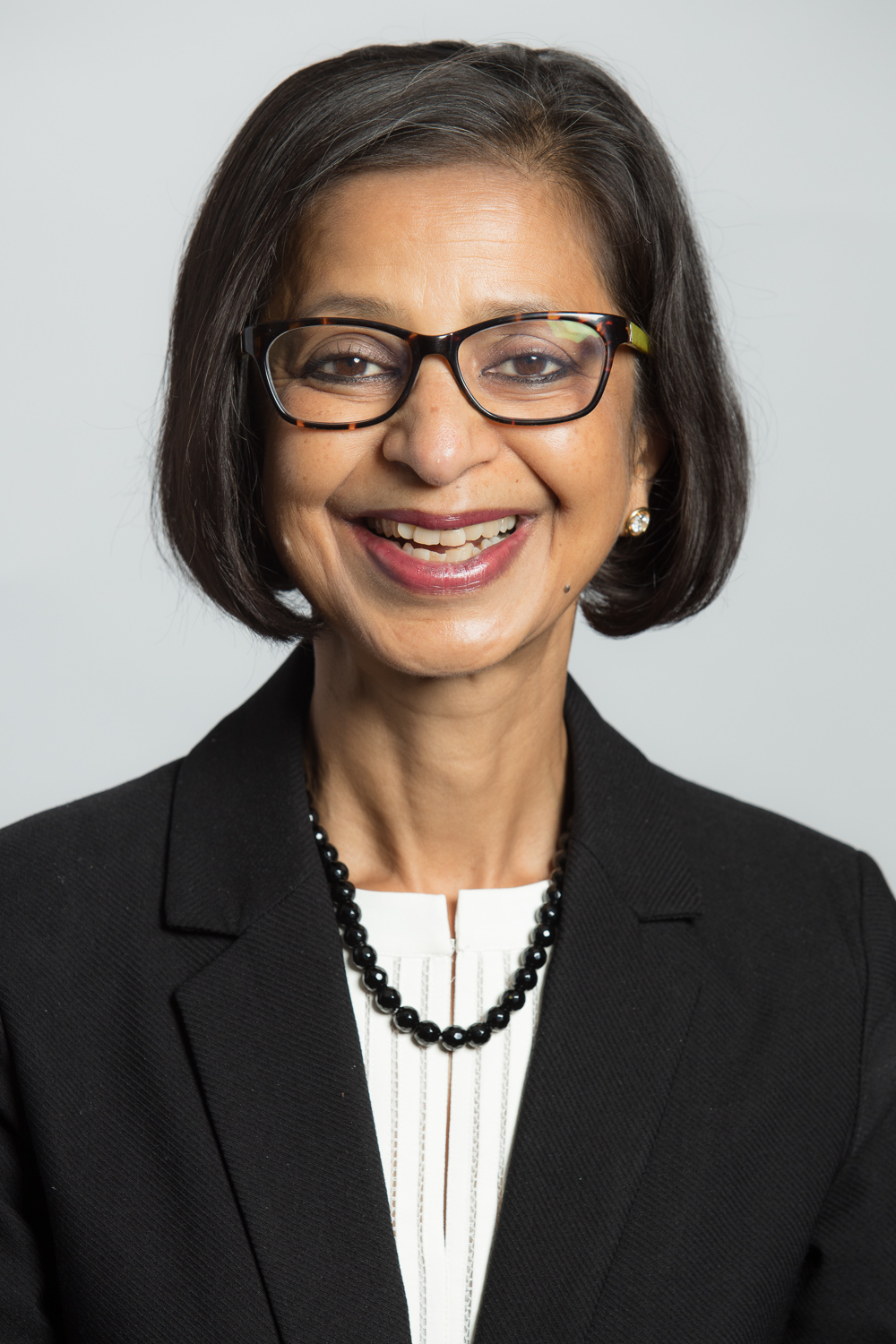

Academic background
- Education: BA, Mathematics, 1982, St. Stephen's College, Delhi; M.S. Computer Science, 1988, L.C. Smith College of Engineering and Computer Science; PhD, 1988, Martin J. Whitman School of Management
- Thesis: Knowledge acquisition for business expert systems: a decision-centric model and its empirical validation (1988)

Academic work
- Institutions: Johns Hopkins University; Robert H. Smith School of Business; University of Dayton

Ritu Agarwal is an Indian-American management scientist specializing in management information systems. She is the Wm Polk Carey Distinguished Professor of Information Systems at Johns Hopkins University. Previously, she was the Senior Associate Dean for Faculty and Research and the Robert H. Smith Dean’s Chair of Information Systems at the Robert H. Smith School of Business. Agarwal was the Editor-in-Chief of Information Systems Research and the founder and director of the Center for Health Information and Decision Systems at the Smith School.

== Early life and education ==
Agarwal earned her Bachelor of Arts degree in mathematics from the St. Stephen's College, Delhi before moving to the United States for her graduate degrees at Syracuse University.

== Career ==
Upon completing her PhD, Agarwal joined the faculty at the University of Dayton as an associate professor of management intelligence systems. In this role, she received a grant from Dayton's Intelligence Systems Applications Center to assist in the development of an artificial intelligence system to help small business owners craft strategic marketing plans. Agarwal eventually joined the faculty at the University of Maryland, College Park's Robert H. Smith School of Business in 1999.

In 2010, Agarwal started the annual Conference on Health IT and Analytics (CHITA). She was also named the editor-in-chief of the journal Information Systems Research beginning January 1, 2011. In her first year as editor-in-chief, Agarwal became a Fellow of the Association for Information Systems, and also received the University of Maryland Distinguished Scholar-Teacher Award. By 2013, she was recognized as "one of the most widely-cited scholars in the field" and was elected a 2013 Distinguished Fellow for her outstanding intellectual contributions to the information systems field.

Following the departure of Alexander Triantis in 2019, Agarwal was appointed interim dean of the University of Maryland. While serving in this role, she was a 2019 recipient of the Association for Information Systems Lyons Electronic Office Lifetime Achievements Award for her work in the field of information systems. During the COVID-19 pandemic, Agarwal and colleague Margrét Bjarnadóttir conducted a study titled Precision Therapy for Neonatal Opioid Withdrawal Syndrome in order to "solve big health care challenges through joint research that draws on the institutions’ world-leading expertise in medicine and artificial intelligence." Their study looked to improve clinical decision making in the treatment of neonatal opioid withdrawal syndrome. She was subsequently appointed to serve on the Acquired Immunodeficiency Syndrome (DAIDS) Subcommittee of the National Institute of Allergy and Infectious Diseases and recognised as being in the top 2% of the most-cited scholars and scientists worldwide.

== Recognition ==
Agarwal is a Fellow of the Institute for Operations Research and the Management Sciences, elected in the 2021 class of fellows.
