= J.D. Kleinke =

American writer

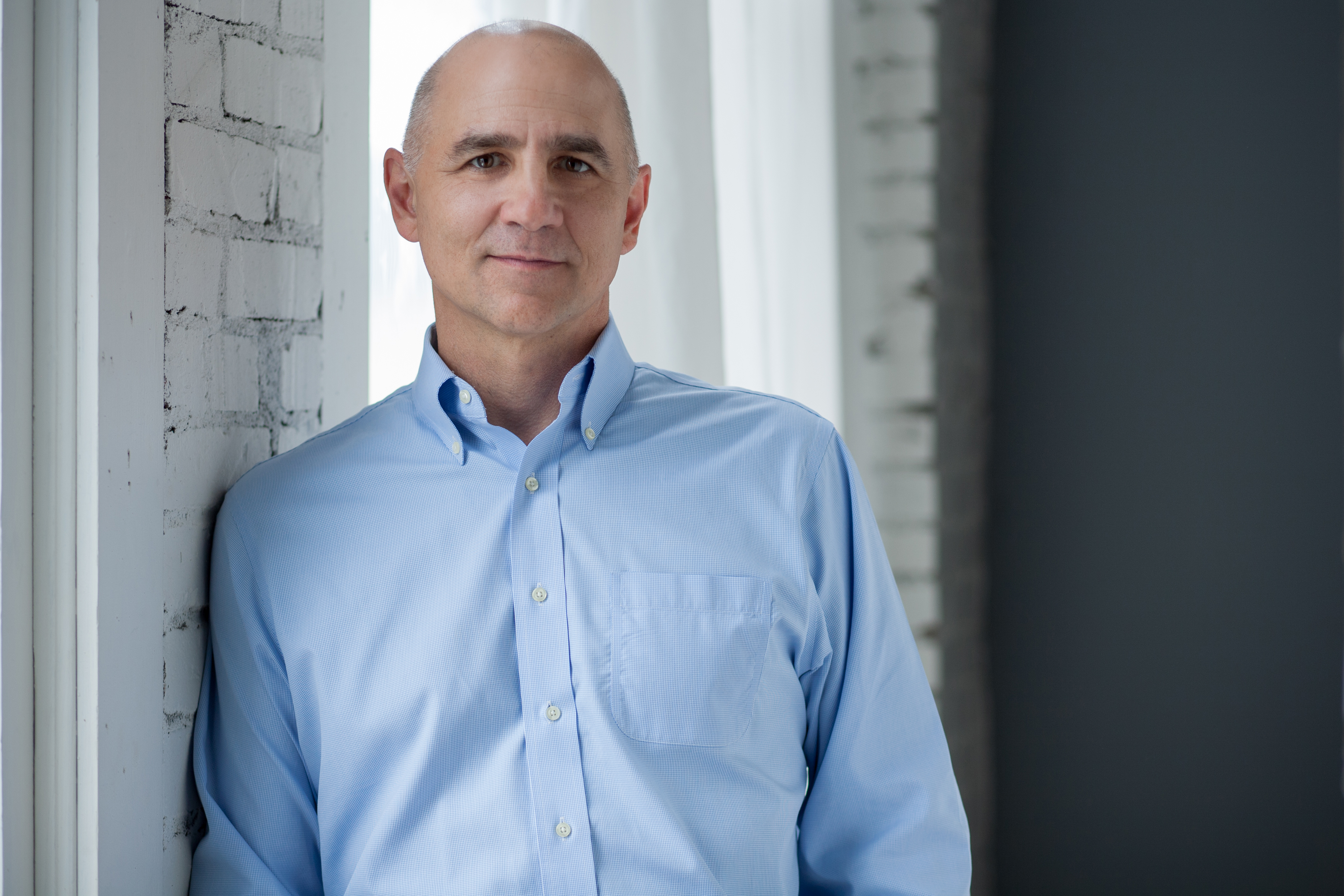
- Born: 1962 (age 63–64); Albany, New York
- Education: M.S.B. Bachelor of Science
- Alma mater: Johns Hopkins University; University of Maryland
- Website: jdkonhealth.com

J.D. Kleinke (born 1962) is a health care industry pioneer. He has written extensively about the economics, politics, and culture of the US health care system, including Bleeding Edge (1998) and Oxymorons (2001) and the medical novel Catching Babies (2011). His work has appeared in The New York Times, The Wall Street Journal, Barron’s, Forbes, Health Affairs, JAMA, and other publications.

During his health career, Kleinke has been involved in the formation, management, and governance of numerous health care information organizations, including Health Grades, Truven Health Analytics, RIMS/Trizetto, Omnimedix Institute, Mount Tabor, and Context Matters. He remains active as a mentor to health care technology start-ups and growth companies, including Wildflower Health and Omada Health.

Over the course of his career, Kleinke has written extensively about the economics, politics, and culture of the US health care system. Since the early 1990s, he was outspoken on the real impact of changes to the system (e.g., managed care, Obamacare, physician payment incentives, computerization), and the effects of such changes on patient care, clinician professional development, health care organization strategy, and the public health. He has served as a Resident Scholar of the American Enterprise Institute, member of the Editorial Board of Health Affairs, and frequent contributor to The Wall Street Journal and The Huffington Post.

== Early life and education ==
Kleinke attended the University of Maryland where he graduated with a Bachelor of Science in 1989. He later attended Carey Business School at Johns Hopkins University where he graduated with a M.S.B. in 1997.

== Career ==
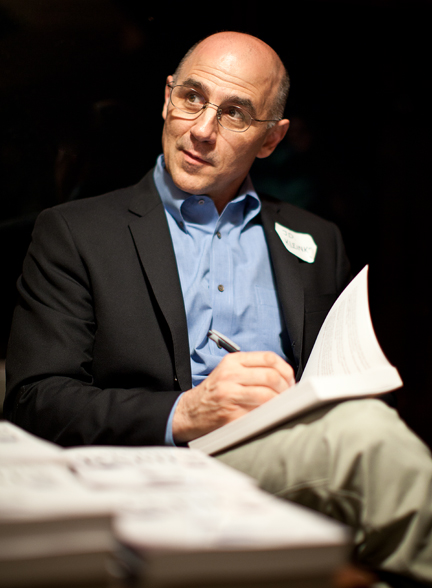
Book signing event with author J.D. Kleinke.

=== Writing and advocacy ===
Kleinke's earliest written work involved critical economic analysis of the first generation of managed care. His first book, Bleeding Edge: The Business of Health Care in the New Century, published in 1998, was a harsh critique of the economic conflict generated by the imposition of untested managed care methods on what was at the time an antiquated, fragmented health care financing and delivery system. His second book, Oxymorons: The Myth of a US Health Care System published in 2001, described in detail a health care system rebuilt around consumer choice, increasing patient cost-sharing, mandated coverage, and exchange-based health plan selection–the cornerstones of what would become the Affordable Care Act, or “Obamacare,” in 2010. Kleinke’ third book, Catching Babies, published in 2011, is a medical novel about the training of obstetrician-gynecologists and the culture of childbirth in the US. Catching Babies is currently in development as a TV series.

From the early 1990s, Kleinke was one of the earliest advocates for the measurement of health care quality, the quantification-based accountability of health care providers, and the computerization of American medicine. He published several journal-length articles on these inter-related subjects in the peer-reviewed policy journal Health Affairs from the mid-1990s through 2005. This work–in particular “Dot-Gov: Market Failure and the Creation of a National Health Information Technology System”–has been widely cited by subsequent researchers and health information technology advocates. Kleinke's work on these subjects was used by policymakers to formulate legislation mandating and funding the adoption of electronic medical records by US health care providers, culminating with the Health Information Technology Act of 2010.

Kleinke was an early supporter of the Affordable Care Act, President Barack Obama’s health reform law, based on his public analyses of the principles of market economics, consumer choice and insurer competition built into the law’s structure–ideas denied or overlooked by the President’s political opponents. As a Resident Fellow at the conservative think-tank, the American Enterprise Institute, Kleinke was the first to publish in the national media the conservative origins of the health care law. Kleinke’s article on these origins in The New York Times, “The Conservative Case for Obamacare”–published five weeks before the re-election of President Obama–generated significant controversy, and his departure from AEI followed three months later.

Kleinke's health care writings have appeared in The Wall Street Journal, The New York Times, Barron's, Health Affairs, JAMA, the British Medical Journal, Modern Healthcare, Managed Healthcare and Forbes.

=== Business career ===
Kleinke's health care writing and advocacy were informed by three decades of working at the forefront of the health information industry. This industry was in its infancy in the early 1990s when Kleinke and fellow students, alumni and faculty-mentors from The Johns Hopkins University established HCIA, the company that would become Solucient and is now known as Truven Health Analytics.

While a graduate student at Hopkins, Kleinke had been serving as Director of Corporate Programs at Sheppard Pratt Health Systems in Towson, Maryland, which at the time, was the largest private psychiatric hospital in the US. While at Sheppard Pratt, Kleinke developed and managed the nation's first provider-based, managed mental health care system. In that early management role, Kleinke recognized the importance of data, information and analysis to the future of the health care system, at a time when nearly every element of the system was paper-based, archaically organized, and grossly inefficient.

Kleinke and his colleagues at HCIA and other start-ups in the early 1990s pioneered what would be the emerging field of “health care informatics,” or the application of quantitative analytical techniques to large sets of data on medical care. (This movement was part of what would come to be known across all industries as “Big Data"). Kleinke helped develop HCIA from a niche health care data analysis firm to a major provider of sophisticated information products and analytical services to health care systems, managed care organizations, and pharmaceutical companies across the U.S. and Europe. Today, its successor organization, Truven Health Analytics, is a health care information company with revenues estimated at more than $500 million per year.

After five years and a successful IPO, Kleinke left HCIA in 1998 and joined the boards of other health care information companies, most notably Health Grades, which democratized the use of health care informatics by applying its methods to consumer health care provider selection. Kleinke served on the company's Board of Directors until 2008, including as Executive Vice Chairman for several years, when it was also a publicly traded company.

In 2004, Kleinke founded and led the Omnimedix Institute, a 501(c)(3) charitable organization that created, built and promoted information technologies for giving patients and their families safe and secure access to and control over their own medical data. With funding from private foundations, public corporations, and the federal government, Omnimedix developed and deployed open and ubiquitous health information technologies designed to increase patient access to the health care system; to data on their own medical care; and to information about the best care available for their medical condition.

In 2007, Kleinke co-founded and led Mount Tabor, a health care information technology development company established to plan, design, build, test and launch systems for the transformation and movement of electronic medical information. Mount Tabor provided business strategy and technology integration services for health care companies, technology providers, and government entities creating health information products, systems and services. Mount Tabor helped build, launch and test the Google Health personal health information platform, and supported the implementation of Microsoft HealthVault personal health information platform.

== Bibliography ==
Books

Year	Title	Original publisher	ISBN	Notes
2011	Catching Babies	Fourth Chapter Books	9780982663905	
2001	Oxymorons: The Myth of a U.S. Health Care System	Jossey-Bass	9780787959708	
1998	Bleeding Edge: The Business of Health Care in the New Century	Aspen Publishers	9780834211902	

Select publications

- 2013, Combat Medicine's 'Golden Hour' in Iraq, One Decade Later, The Huffington Post
- 2012, The Conservative Case for Obamacare, The New York Times
- 2012, The Myth of Runaway Health Spending, The Wall Street Journal
