= Matthew E. Bershadker =

American nonprofit executive

- Office: CEO of American Society for the Prevention of Cruelty to Animals

Matthew E. Bershadker was named president and CEO of American Society for the Prevention of Cruelty to Animals (ASPCA) in May 2013 and serves on the Global Animal Partnership's Board of Directors. He holds an MBA from Johns Hopkins Carey Business School and a Bachelor of Arts degree in communications from Ohio University. His annual salary as of 2023 was $750,000 base salary, with $276,000 in bonuses and benefits of $47,859.

Prior to joining the ASPCA, Bershadker worked for ICF Consulting, Share our Strength and Rape, Abuse and Incest National Network
