= Melinda Beeuwkes Buntin =

American health economist

- Spouse: John Buntin

Academic background
- Education: AB, 1993, Princeton School of Public and International Affairs; PhD, Health Policy, 2000, Harvard University
- Thesis: Competition and Payment Systems under Medicare (2002)

Academic work
- Institutions: Vanderbilt University; Congressional Budget Office; RAND Corporation

Melinda Jean Beeuwkes Buntin is an American health economist and a professor at the Johns Hopkins Bloomberg School of Public Health and the Johns Hopkins Carey Business School. Previously, she was the Mike Curb Chair for Health Policy at Vanderbilt University, having served as a deputy assistant director for Health at the Congressional Budget Office.

== Early life and education ==
Buntin completed her Bachelor of Arts degree from Princeton University and her Ph.D. in Health Policy with a concentration in economics from Harvard University.

== Career ==
Upon completing her PhD, Buntin became the deputy director of the RAND Corporation Health’s Economics, Financing, and Organization Program, director of Public Sector Initiatives for RAND Health, and co-director of the Bing Center for Health Economics. Her research at RAND focused on insurance benefit design, health insurance markets, provider payment, and the care use and needs of the elderly. She also worked with the Office of the National Coordinator for Health Information Technology, where she established and directed the economic analysis, evaluation, and modeling group.

In 2013, Buntin left the Congressional Budget Office to chair the new Department of Health Policy at Vanderbilt University Medical Center. While serving in this role, Buntin was nominated and selected to serve on the Institute of Medicine's Health Care Services Board. In 2017, Buntin was elected a member of the National Academy of Medicine for "driving our nation’s agenda in health policy and biomedical informatics."

In 2018, Buntin was appointed the Mike Curb Chair for Health Policy at Vanderbilt. Following her promotion, Buntin testified in front of the How to Reduce Health Care Costs: Understanding the Cost of Health Care in the United States Senate's Committee on Health, Education, Labor, and Pensions Hearing. During the following school year, Buntin and Carolyn Heinrich served as co-principal investigators for the Policies for Action Research Hub "to better understand and develop recommendations to address the needs of some of Tennessee’s most vulnerable children." She also led a research team in analyzing spending trends of those eligible for coverage under both Medicaid and Medicare in the United States. The purpose of the study was to gain insight into how much is being spent and by whom.

During the COVID-19 pandemic, Buntin was named the deputy editor of JAMA Health Forum, a new online information channel published by JAMA Network. She also served on the Health Policy and Public Health Covid-19 Advisory Pane to develop a complex predictive model of the spread of COVID-19 within Tennessee. The group subsequently published advisory memos to aid COVID-19 response. By September, Buntin argued towards re-opening schools and was recognized as a Women of Influence by the Nashville Business Journal.

== Personal life ==
Buntin and her husband John Buntin have two sons together.
