= Legg Mason Tower =

High-rise building in Baltimore

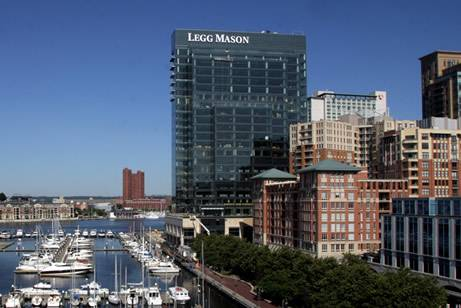
- Interactive map of the Legg Mason Tower area

General information
- Location: 100 International Dr. Baltimore, Maryland; 21202-1099 USA
- Coordinates: 39°16′57.3″N 76°36′05.8″W
- Current tenants: Legg Mason, Inc., RSM US LLP, Hogan & Hartson LLP, Johns Hopkins Carey Business School, Oppenheimer & Co., Deutsche Bank Private Wealth Management, JMI Equity; Medifast, Inc. Exis, LLC
- Completed: 2009
- Owner: H&S Properties Development Corp.

Technical details
- Floor count: 24

Design and construction
- Architect: Beatty Harvey Coco Architects with HKS Architects
- Main contractor: Harbor East Development Group

Website
- http://www.leggmason.com

Legg Mason Tower is a 24-story glass high-rise located at 100 International Drive in Baltimore's Harbor East development. The building is currently known as the 100 International Drive building since the sale of Legg Mason to Franklin Templeton in 2020.

Completed in May 2009, the 650,000-square-foot (60,000 m^{2}) waterfront skyscraper was developed by Harbor East Development Group, and reaches a height of 360.5 feet (109.9 m). It was designed by Beatty Harvey Coco Architects with HKS Architects, and is situated at the edge of the city's Inner Harbor. This Class-A office building serves as the new headquarters for asset management firm Legg Mason, which moved from what was the Legg Mason Building at 100 Light Street.

It is also known as the home campus of the Johns Hopkins Carey Business School. The building is part of a mixed-use development with its neighbor, the Four Seasons Hotel, which was completed and opened in 2011. It is Pre-Certified Silver under the LEED Core and Shell Program, and was one of six developments recognized by the Urban Land Institute Wavemaker Award in 2009.

== See also ==
- List of tallest buildings in Baltimore
