= Synygy =

- Synygy logo
- Type: Private
- Headquarters: Chester, Pennsylvania, USA
- Services: Consulting; technology; outsourcing
- Formerly called: Simulate

Synygy was a private company with its worldwide headquarters in Singapore and its US headquarters in Chester, Pennsylvania, USA. It provided consulting, technology, and outsourcing services related to incentive compensation management and sales performance management, with a focus on for sales strategy enablement, sales force motivation, sales channel effectiveness, and sales performance insight. The company was founded by Mark A. Stiffler in 1991. Originally named Simulate, it was renamed Synygy in 1997. Synygy was one of the earliest vendors to enter the Incentive Compensation Management (ICM) space, initially in the provision of ICM outsourcing services in 1993, followed by the creation of ICM software products starting in 2002. ICM became the foundation of what is now known as Sales Performance Management.

In 2009, Synygy began using third-party products to deliver its services, and the company exited the software development business. In 2014, Synygy informed its clients that it would be ending support for its software. In 2015, Synygy ceased selling professional services, and by the end of 2015, the company had ceased operations.

== Clients ==
Synygy's first three clients were the pharmaceutical companies Schering-Plough, Janssen Pharmaceutica, and Wyeth-Ayerst. During its 25 years in business, Synygy served nearly all industries, including Life Sciences, Manufacturing and Distribution, Retail, Banking, Financial services, Telecommunications, High-Tech, and Insurance (Health, Life, Property & Casualty).

Synygy targeted companies with complex challenges related to sales data integration and transformation, sales incentive compensation management, quota and objectives setting, territory management, sales workflow process automation, and sales business intelligence and analytics. The company did not sell to governments or smaller companies.

== Competitors ==
Synygy competed with professional services companies that include Accenture, CallidusCloud, Alexander Group, Aon Hewitt, Bain & Company, Better Sales Comp, Boston Consulting Group, Buck, Canidium, Colletti-Fiss, Cygnal Group, Deloitte, KPMG, McKinsey & Company, Mercer, OpenSymmetry, Sibson, Towers Watson, Valitus, and ZS Associates.

== Founder ==
Synygy's founder, Mark Stiffler, holds an undergraduate degree in civil engineering, a master's degree in management information systems, and a master's degree in business administration, all from the Massachusetts Institute of Technology (MIT).

== US Headquarters ==
Starting in 2005, Synygy's US headquarters was situated in a Beaux Arts-style building (c. 1918) along the Delaware River. The building once was the Chester Waterside Power Station, which was described by the Historic American Buildings Survey as one of the best-preserved and most monumental early power plants in the United States. The facility, which stopped producing power in 1982, was unoccupied for nearly two decades.

== See also ==
- Sales effectiveness
- Sales management
- Sales operations
- Pay for performance (human resources)
- Performance Management
- Sales Force Automation
- Sales Force Compensation
