= Karen Peetz =

Karen Peetz was the president of The Bank of New York Mellon from 2013 to 2016. She had joined the company and 1998, and prior to her appointment as the bank's first female president, had led the bank's financial markets and treasury services team; she was consistently ranked among the most powerful women in banking and was ranked as No.1 in 2011.

In 2009, she co-founded the Bank of New York Mellon Women's Initiative Network (WIN), a resource group for female employees' professional development.

In 2020, she joined Citi as Chief Administrative Officer. She was named as the 7th most powerful woman in banking in 2022. She stepped down from the post in May 2023 and was succeeded by Anand Selva.

== Education ==
Peetz earned her Bachelor of Science degree from the Pennsylvania State University, and a Master of Science in Applied Behavioral Science degree from Johns Hopkins University Carey Business School.
