= W. P. Carey =

Real estate investment trust

W. P. Carey Inc.
- Type: Public company
- Traded as: NYSE: WPC; S&P 400 component
- Industry: Real estate investment trust
- Founded: 1973; 53 years ago
- Founder: William P. Carey
- Headquarters: New York City
- Key people: Christopher J. Niehaus (Chairman); Jason E. Fox (CEO); ToniAnn Sanzone (CFO)
- Revenue: ▲US$1.72 billion (2025)
- Net income: ▲US$466 million (2025)
- Total assets: ▲US$18.0 billion (2025)
- Total equity: ▼US$8.12 billion (2025)
- Number of employees: 203 (2024)
- Website: wpcarey.com

W. P. Carey is a real estate investment trust that invests in properties leased to single tenants via NNN leases. The company is organized in Maryland, with its primary office in New York City.

As of December 31, 2024, the company owned 1,555 properties in 26 countries leased to 355 tenants. Approximately 61% of the company's revenue is derived in United States and 33% in Europe.

== History ==
The company was founded in 1973 by William P. Carey.

In the early 1980s, the company was innovative in the use of leaseback transactions to acquire properties.

In 2012, company founder William P. Carey died. The company also merged with its non-traded real estate investment trust affiliate, Corporate Property Associates 15, and reorganized into a real estate investment trust.

In October 2018, the company merged with CPA:17 - Global.

In November 2023, the company completed the corporate spin-off of its office properties.
