= Phillip Phan =

Singaporean academic

Academic background
- Education: University of Washington (PhD, 1992); University of Hawaii at Manoa (BBA, 1984)

Academic work
- Discipline: Strategy; Entrepreneurship
- Institutions: Johns Hopkins University

Phillip Phan is Alonzo and Virginia Decker Professor of Strategy and Entrepreneurship at the Carey Business School, Johns Hopkins University, with expertise in the areas of strategy and entrepreneurship. Phan's research examines corporate governance, entrepreneurship and technology transfer, regional economic development, and innovation management in healthcare. He is currently Editor-in-Chief of Academy of Management Perspectives.

== Career ==
Phillip Phan earned his BBA from University of Hawaii at Manoa in 1984 and PhD in strategic management from the Foster School of Business of University of Washington in 1992, with Charles W.L. Hill as his dissertation chair. Prior to joining Johns Hopkins University in 2008, Phan served as Warren H. Bruggeman ’46 and Pauline Urban Bruggeman Distinguished Professor at Lally School of Management, Rensselaer Polytechnic Institute. He was also a Tommie Goh Distinguished Visiting Professor of Entrepreneurship and Business at Singapore Management University.

At Johns Hopkins University, Phan is Alonzo and Virginia Decker Professor of Strategy and Entrepreneurship. He also holds joint faculty appointments in the Johns Hopkins School of Medicine and Whiting School of Engineering. Between 2011 and 2012, he served as the Interim Dean of Carey Business School. He also served as the Carey Business School's Senior Executive Vice Dean between 2010 and 2015, and Vice Dean for Faculty and Research between 2008 and 2009.

== Academic work ==
Phan is known for his work in corporate governance, entrepreneurship and technology transfer, regional economic development, and innovation management in healthcare. He is among the most cited scholars on the subject of science parks and technology entrepreneurship. His work has found applications in a wide range of industries, most notably in healthcare. He has published over 100 peer-reviewed articles and is an author (or coauthor) of nine books.

Phan is currently Editor-in-Chief of Academy of Management Perspectives, Academic Editor of Medicine (non-clinical medicine section), and Associate Editor of Journal of Technology Transfer.

== Publications ==
=== Highly cited articles ===
According to Google Scholar, Phan's 10 most widely cited papers are:

- Phan, Phillip H.; Siegel, Donald S.; Wright, Mike (2005). "Science parks and incubators: observations, synthesis and future research". Journal of Business Venturing. 20 (2): 165–182. doi:10.1016/j.jbusvent.2003.12.001. ISSN 0883-9026.
- Markman, Gideon D.; Phan, Phillip H.; Balkin, David B.; Gianiodis, Peter T. (2005). "Entrepreneurship and university-based technology transfer". Journal of Business Venturing. 20 (2): 241–263. doi:10.1016/j.jbusvent.2003.12.003. ISSN 0883-9026.
- Hill, Charles W. L.; Phan, Phillip (1991). "CEO Tenure As a Determinant of CEO Pay". Academy of Management Journal. 34 (3): 707–717. doi:10.5465/256413 (inactive 12 July 2025). ISSN 0001-4273.
- Markman, Gideon D.; Gianiodis, Peter T.; Phan, Phillip H.; Balkin, David B. (2005). "Innovation speed: Transferring university technology to market". Research Policy. 34 (7): 1058–1075. doi:10.1016/j.respol.2005.05.007. ISSN 0048-7333.
- Walls, Judith L.; Berrone, Pascual; Phan, Phillip H. (2012). "Corporate governance and environmental performance: is there really a link?". Strategic Management Journal. 33 (8): 885–913. doi:10.1002/smj.1952. hdl:10220/19591. ISSN 0143-2095.
- Phan, Phillip H.; Wright, Mike; Ucbasaran, Deniz; Tan, Wee-Liang (2009). "Corporate entrepreneurship: Current research and future directions". Journal of Business Venturing. 24 (3): 197–205. doi:10.1016/j.jbusvent.2009.01.007. ISSN 0883-9026.
- Fan, Terence; Phan, Phillip (2007). "International new ventures: revisiting the influences behind the 'born-global' firm". Journal of International Business Studies. 38 (7): 1113–1131. doi:10.1057/palgrave.jibs.8400308. ISSN 0047-2506. S2CID 167874711.
- Markman, Gideon D.; Gianiodis, Peter T.; Phan, Phillip H.; Balkin, David B. (2004). "Entrepreneurship from the Ivory Tower: Do Incentive Systems Matter?". The Journal of Technology Transfer. 29 (3/4): 353–364. doi:10.1023/B:JOTT.0000034127.01889.86. ISSN 0892-9912. S2CID 154351138.
- Bonn, Ingrid; Yoshikawa, Toru; Phan, Phillip H (2004). "Effects of Board Structure on Firm Performance: A Comparison Between Japan and Australia". Asian Business & Management. 3 (1): 105–125. doi:10.1057/palgrave.abm.9200068. ISSN 1472-4782. S2CID 154931774.
- Phan, Phillip H.; Hill, Charles W. L. (1995). "Organizational Restructuring And Economic Performance In Leveraged Buyouts: An Ex Post Study". Academy of Management Journal. 38 (3): 704–739. doi:10.5465/256743 (inactive 12 July 2025). ISSN 0001-4273.

=== Books ===
- Phan, Phillip (2000). Taking back the boardroom : better directing for the new millennium. New York London: McGraw-Hill. ISBN 978-0-07-116708-6. OCLC 43820669.
- Phan, P.H.; Phan, P. (2002). Technological Entrepreneurship. Research in entrepreneurship and management (in French). Information Age Pub. ISBN 978-1-930608-81-8.
- Phan, Phillip (2008). Theoretical developments and future research in family business. Charlotte, N.C: IAP-Information Age Pub. ISBN 978-1-59311-551-7. OCLC 254165624.
- Phan, Phillip (2008). Entrepreneurship in emerging regions around the world : theory, evidence and implications. Cheltenham, UK Northampton, MA: Edward Elgar. ISBN 978-1-84720-800-2. OCLC 232610833.
- Phan, Phillip (2007). Taking back the boardroom : thriving as a 21st-century director. London Hackensack, N.J: Imperial College Press Distributed by World Scientific. ISBN 978-1-86094-836-7. OCLC 261136548.
- Phan, Phillip (2014). Theory and empirical research in social entrepreneurship. Cheltenham, UK Northampton, Massachusetts: Edward Elgar. ISBN 978-1-78254-682-5. OCLC 865492076.
- Phan, Phillip (2013). Conversations and Empirical Evidence in Microfinance. IMPERIAL COLLEGE PRESS. doi:10.1142/p904. ISBN 978-1-78326-298-4.
- Phan, Phillip (2016). Technology entrepreneurship and business incubation : theory, practice, lessons learned. London: Imperial College Press. ISBN 978-1-78326-976-1. OCLC 949850813.
- Espina, Maritza; Phan, Phillip; Markman, Gideon (2018). Social innovation and sustainable entrepreneurship. Cheltenham, UK: Edward Elgar Publishing. ISBN 978-1-78811-684-8. OCLC 1049802535.
