= Douglas Jabs =

American ophthalmologist

- Education: Dartmouth College, Johns Hopkins School of Medicine, Carey Business School
- Known for: clinical research in CMV retinitis and uveitis
- Scientific career
- Fields: ophthalmology
- Workplaces: Mount Sinai Medical Center

Douglas Jabs is an American ophthalmologist and an expert in clinical research in the fields of ophthalmology and uveitis.

Jabs is currently the chief executive officer of the Mount Sinai Faculty Practice Associates, dean for clinical affairs, and professor and chair of the department of ophthalmology and professor of medicine of The Mount Sinai School of Medicine in New York City. Additionally, he is adjunct professor of epidemiology at the Johns Hopkins Bloomberg School of Public Health in Baltimore, Maryland.

He is the author or co–author of over 230 publications, 45 books chapters and 86 published abstracts.

== Biography ==
Jabs graduated valedictorian from Dartmouth College in 1973 with a degree in chemistry. He received his medical degree from Johns Hopkins School of Medicine in 1977, and MBA degree from Johns Hopkins University's Carey Business School in 1998. He completed an internship in internal medicine at New York Hospital–Cornell Medical Center, a residency in internal medicine at The Johns Hopkins Hospital and a residency in ophthalmology at the Wilmer Eye Institute, and a rheumatology fellowship at Johns Hopkins.

Jabs joined the faculty at the Johns Hopkins School of Medicine in 1984 as assistant professor. He was named associate professor of ophthalmology in 1988, and associate professor of medicine in 1989. In 1993 he was named professor of both ophthalmology and medicine, and in 2000 he was named professor of epidemiology at the Bloomberg School of Public Health. In 2007, he was named professor and chair of the department of ophthalmology at The Mount Sinai Medical Center. In 2009, he was chosen as the chief executive officer of the Mount Sinai Faculty Practice Associates and dean for clinical affairs of the Mount Sinai School of Medicine.

Jabs currently chairs both the Study of Ocular Complications of AIDS (SOCA) Research Group and the Multicenter Uveitis Steroid Treatment (MUST) Trial. He has chaired five randomized, controlled, clinical trials on the treatment of CMV retinitis and now chairs a multicenter epidemiologic study investigating the long–term outcomes of patients with ocular complications of AIDS, particularly CMV retinitis. Jabs has been instrumental in leading the Standardization of Uveitis (SUN) project, an effort to standardize terminology and outcomes related to uveitis. He has served on numerous data and safety monitoring committees for clinical trials, both those sponsored by the National Institutes of Health and the pharmaceutical industry.

Jabs has been on the editorial board of The Journal of Retinal and Vitreous Diseases, Ocular Immunology and Inflammation, American Journal of Ophthalmology, and Ophthalmic Epidemiology.

He is the recipient of many awards including the Research to Prevent Blindness Olga Keith Weiss Scholar Award, Research to Prevent Blindness Lew R. Wasserman Merit Award, Research to Prevent Blindness Senior Scientific Investigator, American Academy of Ophthalmology Senior Achievement Award, Clinical Uveitis Research Award from the German Uveitis Patient Interest Group, EyeCare America, Lifetime Volunteer Physician Award, and European Uveitis Patient Interest Association (EUPIA) Uveitis Award.

== Publications ==
- Jabs DA (1998). "Acyclovir for recurrent herpes simplex virus ocular disease". N Engl J Med. 339 (5): 340–341. doi:10.1056/NEJM199807303390510. PMID 9682049.
- Jabs DA, Rosenbaum JT, Foster CS, Holland GN, Jaffe GJ, Louie JS, Nussenblatt RB, Stiehm RE, Tessler H, Van Gelder RN, Whitcup SM, Yocum D (2000). "Guidelines for the use of immunosuppressive drugs in patients with ocular inflammatory disorders: recommendations of an expert panel". Am J Ophthalmol. 130 (5): 492–513. doi:10.1016/s0002-9394(01)00830-3. PMID 11354352.
- Jabs DA, Mudun A, Dunn JP, Marsh MJ (2000). "Episcleritis and scleritis: clinical features and treatment results". Am J Ophthalmol. 130 (4): 469–476. doi:10.1016/s0002-9394(00)00710-8. PMID 11024419.
- Jabs DA, Martin BK, Forman MS, Hubbard L, Dunn JP, Kempen JH, Davis JL, Weinberg DV (2003). "Cytomegalovirus resistance to ganciclovir and clinical outcomes of patients with cytomegalovirus retinitis". Am J Ophthalmol. 135 (1): 26–34. doi:10.1016/s0002-9394(02)01759-2. PMID 12504693.
- Jabs DA, Holbrook JT, Van Natta ML, Clark R, Jacobson MA, Kempen JH, Murphy RL (2005). "Risk factors for mortality in patients with AIDS in the era of highly active antiretroviral therapy". Ophthalmology. 112 (5): 771–779. doi:10.1016/j.ophtha.2004.10.049. PMID 15878056.
- Thorne JE, Jabs DA, Peters GB, Hair D, Dunn JP, Kempen JH (2005). "Birdshot retinochoroidopathy: ocular complications and visual impairment". Am J Ophthalmol. 140 (1): 45–51. doi:10.1016/j.ajo.2005.01.035. PMID 16038650.
- Jabs DA, Nussenblatt RB, Rosenbaum JT (September 2005). "Standardization of uveitis nomenclature for reporting clinical data. Results of the First International Workshop". Am. J. Ophthalmol. 140 (3): 509–16. doi:10.1016/j.ajo.2005.03.057. PMC 8935739. PMID 16196117. S2CID 2347552.
- Thorne JE, Wittenberg SE, Jabs DA, Peters GB, Kedhar SR, Dunn JP (2006). "Multifocal choroiditis with panuveitis: incidence of ocular complications and loss of visual acuity". Ophthalmology. 113 (12): 2310–2316. doi:10.1016/j.ophtha.2006.05.067. PMID 16996607.
- Thorne JE, Jabs DA, Kedhar SR, Peters GB, Dunn JP (2008). "Loss of visual field among patients with birdshot chorioretinopathy". Am J Ophthalmol. 145 (1): 23–28. doi:10.1016/j.ajo.2007.08.039. PMID 17997394.
- Jabs DA (2008). "AIDS and ophthalmology, 2008". Arch Ophthalmol. 126 (8): 1143–1146. doi:10.1001/archopht.126.8.1143. PMID 18695113.
- Galor A, Jabs DA, Leder HA, Kedhar SR, Dunn JP, Thorne JE (2008). "Comparison of antimetabolite drugs as corticosteroid–sparing therapy for noninfectious ocular inflammation". Ophthalmology. 115 (10): 1826–1832. doi:10.1016/j.ophtha.2008.04.026. PMID 18579209.
- Kempen JH, Daniel E, Dunn JP, Foster CS, Gangaputra S, Hanish A, Helzlsouer KJ, Jabs DA, Kaçmaz RO, Levy-Clarke GA, Liesegang TL, Newcomb CW, Nussenblatt RB, Pujari SS, Rosenbaum JT, Suhler EB, Thorne JE (2009). "Overall and cancer related mortality among patients with ocular inflammation treated with immunosuppressive therapy: retrospective cohort study". Br Med J. 339 b2480. doi:10.1136/bmj.b2480. PMC 2714688. PMID 19578087.
- Jabs DA, Martin BK, Forman MS (January 2010). "Mortality associated with resistant cytomegalovirus among patients with cytomegalovirus retinitis and AIDS". Ophthalmology. 117 (1): 128–132.e2. doi:10.1016/j.ophtha.2009.06.016. PMC 2815221. PMID 19818505.
