= Christopher S. Tang =

Christopher Tang

Academic background
- Education: Yale University
- Doctoral advisor: Eric V. Denardo

Academic work
- Discipline: operations management, supply chain management
- Institutions: University of California, Los Angeles
- Awards: Fellows (INFORMS, MSOM, POMS)

Christopher Tang is a distinguished professor at the University of California, Los Angeles. Since 2002, he held the Edward W. Carter chair in business administration at its Anderson School of Management. Elected as an INFORMS fellow in 2011, Fellow of the Production and Operations Society in 2011, and Fellow of the MSOM Society in 2015. In 2024, he was elected as Hagler Fellow of the Texas A&M University .

He served as the Vice President of Publications at INFORMS since 2023. He has also served as the Editor-in-Chief of M&SOM between 2015-2020. From 2002 to 2004 he was dean of the business school of the National University of Singapore.

He received his PhD, MPhil, and MA from Yale University, and his BSc (First Class Honours) from King's College, London.

== Books ==
- Product Variety Management (co-edited with Teck Ho), Kluwer, 1998.
- Supply Chain Analysis (co-edited with Chung Piaw Teo and Kwok Kee Wei), Springer, 2008.
- Consumer-Driven Demand and Operations Management Models: A Systematic Study of Information-Technology-Enabled Sales Mechanisms (International Series in Operations Research & Management Science)] (co-edited with Serguei Netessine), Springer, 2009
- A Long View of Research and Practice in Operations Research and Management Science: The Past and the Future (International Series in Operations Research & Management Science)] (co-edited with ManMohan Sodhi), Springer, 2012.
- Managing Supply Chain Risk (International Series in Operations Research & Management Science) (co-written with ManMohan Sodhi), Springer, 2012.
- Handbook of Information Exchange in Supply Chain Management (co-edited with Albert Ha), Springer, 2016.
- Agricultural Supply Chain Management Research : Operations and Analytics in Planting, Selling, and Government Interventions (co-edited with Onur Boyabatlı and Burak Kazaz), Springer, 2022.
- Responsible and Sustainable Operations: The New Frontier (edited by Christopher Tang), Springer, 2024.
