= Alexander Triantis =

Dean of the Carey Business School at Johns Hopkins University
- Incumbent
- Assumed office August 15, 2019
- Preceded by: Bernard T. Ferrari

Personal details
- Born: Toronto
- Education: University of Toronto; Stanford University
- Website: carey.jhu.edu/about/leadership/alexander-triantis

Alexander Triantis is a Canadian academic administrator serving as dean of the Johns Hopkins Carey Business School since 2019. He was dean of the Robert H. Smith School of Business from 2013 to 2019. He is the board chair of the Association to Advance Collegiate Schools of Business.

Triantis' father was a professor of economics. He took his first college math class at the University of Toronto at the age of 13. He completed a B.A.Sc. and M.Eng. from the University of Toronto. He then completed an M.S. and Ph.D. in industrial engineering with a specialization in finance from Stanford University.
