= University of Colorado Denver Business School =

Business school of the University of Colorado-Denver

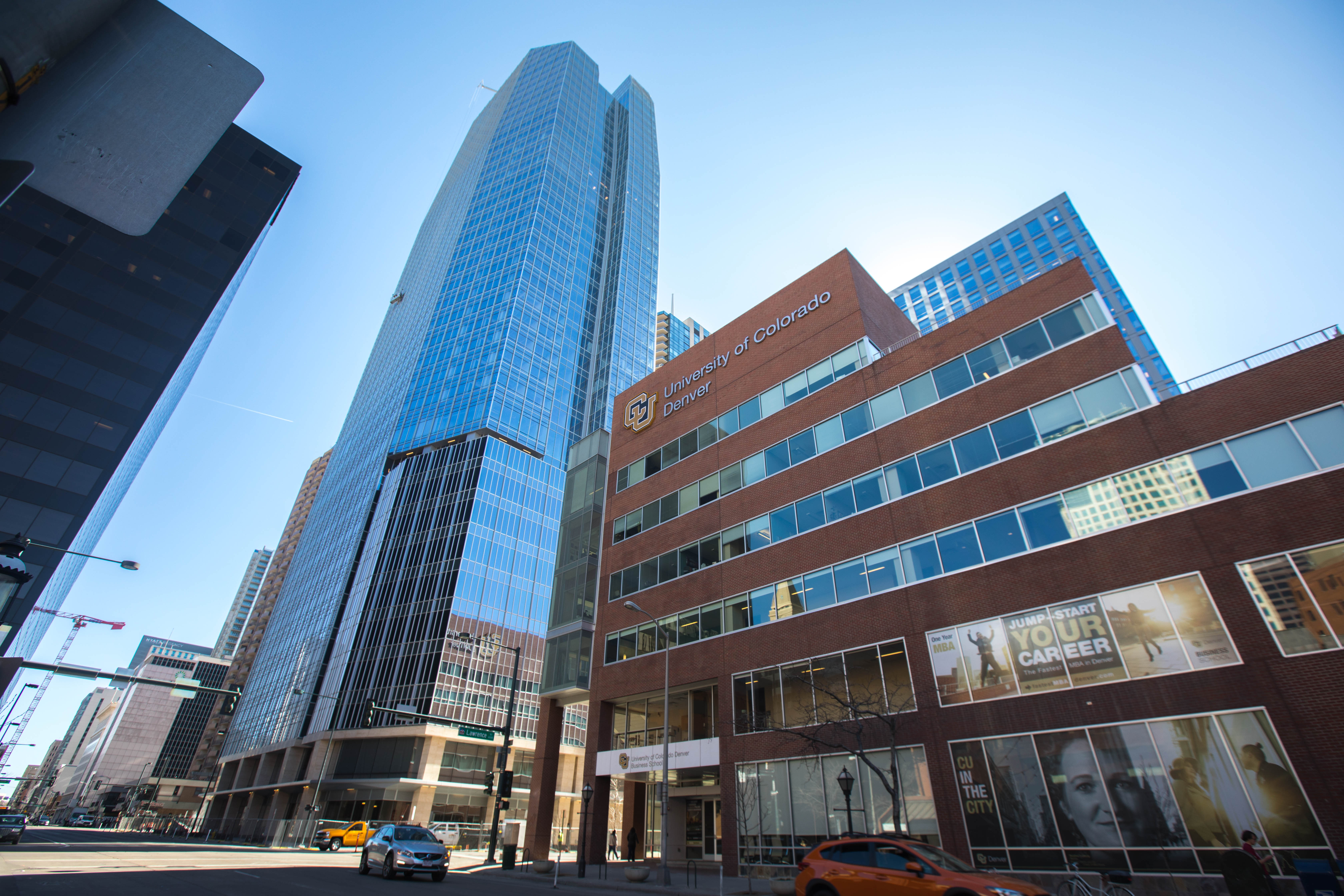
- The Business School moved into this building, the former Quiznos headquarters, in 2012.

Location
- 1475 Lawrence Street; Denver, Colorado 80202

Information
- Type: Business school
- Motto: Denver Built. Global Ready.
- Established: 1985; 41 years ago
- Affiliation: AACSB
- Website: business.ucdenver.edu
- Last updated: November 12, 2019

The University of Colorado Denver Business School is a college located in Denver, Colorado, which offers undergraduate and graduate business degrees. The Business School is accredited by the Association to Advance Collegiate Schools of Business (AACSB). As of fall 2022, there were 1,932 undergraduate students and 1,719 students enrolled in the Graduate programs. The school has over 27,000 alumni. CU Denver Business School offers the 2nd best public business school program in Colorado. It is the 9th largest AACSB-accredited business school in the United States to offer a full-time specialized master's degree program.[2]

In 2012, The Business School moved to its current location in downtown Denver at 1475 Lawrence Street. The 120,000-square-foot building contains both the Business School offices and classrooms.[3]

== Institutional Profile ==
The University of Colorado Denver Business School is accredited by AACSB International.[4] The school is accredited at both the undergraduate and graduate levels and holds a separate accreditation for its accounting program.[5] The school is located in the heart of the Denver Business District and works closely with many of the state’s top businesses including 1st Bank, JP Morgan, TIAA, PwC, Comcast, and Charles Schwab. The Business School's curriculum features input from area businesses which make up the Business School's Board of Advisors and Advisory Councils.

== Undergraduate degrees ==
The University of Colorado Denver Business School offers one undergraduate degree, a Bachelor of Science in Business Administration. Students can obtain majors in:

- Accounting
- Entrepreneurship
- Finance
- Financial Management
- Human Resources
- Information Systems
- International Business
- Management
- Marketing
- Risk Management and Insurance
- Sports Business

== Graduate degrees ==
=== Master of Business Administration Programs ===
CU Denver Business School offers the following Master of Business Administration options:

- Professional MBA
- Online Professional MBA
- One Year MBA
- Health Administration MBA
- Executive MBA in Healthcare Administration
- Executive MBA

=== Master of Science Programs ===
CU Denver Business School offers the following Master of Science degrees:

- Accounting
- Business Analytics
- Entrepreneurship
- Finance and Risk Management
- Global Energy Management
- Health Administration
- Information Systems
- International Business
- Management
- Marketing

==== Specializations for MBA or MS Graduate Degrees ====
- Accounting
- Bioinnovation and Entrepreneurship
- Business Analytics
- Business Intelligence
- Business Strategy
- Commodities
- Entrepreneurship
- Finance
- Information Systems
- International Business
- Management
- Managing for Sustainability
- Marketing
- Risk Management and Insurance
- Sports and Entertainment

=== Dual Degrees ===
MBA students can add a Master of Science degree in:

- Accounting
- Business Analytics
- Entrepreneurship
- Finance and Risk Management
- Global Energy Management
- Information Systems
- International Business
- Management
- Marketing

In addition, dual degrees can be earned through partners in:

- MD from the University of Colorado School of Medicine
- PharmD from the Skaggs School of Pharmacy and Pharmaceutical Sciences
- MArch from the CU Denver College of Architecture and Planning
- MURP from the CU Denver College of Architecture and Planning
- MLA from the CU Denver College of Architecture and Planning
- MA Political Science from the CU Denver College of Liberal Arts and Sciences
- MS Bioengineering from the CU Denver College of Engineering, Design and Computing
- Graduate School of Banking at Colorado
- Master of Arts in Economics, CU Denver School of Liberal Arts and Sciences
- MA in Economics from CU Denver can add the MS in Finance

Students from these programs can combine their degrees with an MBA or MS from University of Colorado Denver:

- Master of International Management (MIM), Thunderbird School of Global Management, Glendale, Arizona
- Graduate School of Banking, University of Colorado Boulder
