= Information Systems Research =

- Discipline: Information systems
- Language: English
- Edited by: Suprateek Sarker

Publication details
- History: 1990–present
- Publisher: Institute for Operations Research and the Management Sciences
- Frequency: Quarterly
- Impact factor: 5.490 (2021)

Standard abbreviations
- ISO 4: Inf. Syst. Res.

Indexing
- CODEN: ISYREH
- ISSN: 1047-7047 (print); 1526-5536 (web)
- LCCN: 90649997
- OCLC no.: 20750174

Links
- Journal homepage; Online access; https://pubsonline.informs.org/loi/isre

Information Systems Research is a quarterly peer-reviewed academic journal that covers research in the areas of information systems and information technology, including cognitive psychology, economics, computer science, operations research, design science, organization theory and behavior, sociology, and strategic management. It is published by the Institute for Operations Research and the Management Sciences and was in 2007 ranked as one of the most prestigious journals in the information systems discipline. In 2008 it was selected as one of the top 20 professional/academic journals by Bloomberg Businessweek. The current editor-in-chief is Suprateek Sarker, who was preceded by Alok Gupta (University of Minnesota), Ritu Agarwal (2011–2016; University of Maryland, College Park), Vallabh Sambamurthy (2005–2010; Michigan State University), Chris F. Kemerer (2002–2004), Izak Benbasat (1999–2001), John Leslie King (1993–1998), and E. Burton Swanson (1990–1992). According to the Journal Citation Reports, the journal has a 2018 impact factor of 2.457. The journal is member of the Senior Scholar's 'Basket of Eight'.
