= William P. Carey =

American philanthropist and businessman

- Born: William Polk Carey; May 11, 1930
- Died: January 2, 2012 (aged 81)
- Education: Gilman School; Pomfret School; Princeton University; University of Pennsylvania (BA)
- Known for: founding W. P. Carey namesake of Carey Business School and University of Pennsylvania Carey Law School

William Polk Carey (May 11, 1930 – January 2, 2012) was an American philanthropist and businessman. He was the founder of W. P. Carey & Co., a corporate real estate financing firm headquartered in New York City. As a result of his donations, he is the namesake of several graduate schools, including the Johns Hopkins Carey Business School, the University of Maryland Francis King Carey School of Law, the Arizona State University W. P. Carey School of Business, and the University of Pennsylvania Carey Law School.

== Early life, career, and family ==
As a young man, Carey attended elementary school at Calvert School and left Roland Park's Gilman School to go to the Pomfret School in Connecticut, then attended Princeton University. He left Princeton for supposedly missing chapel and attended the University of Pennsylvania, graduating in 1953, before establishing himself in New Jersey working in his step-father's car dealership. Carey resided in New York City and Rensselaerville, New York. Carey was an alumnus of the Delta Phi fraternity and was an active member in the University of Pennsylvania chapter. He was an active member of the University Club in NYC. He was also Governor-General of the Society of Mayflower Descendants in New York State.

== Philanthropy and legacy ==
=== Carey Hall at The Gilman School ===
In the mid-1990s, the Gilman School started discussing much-needed renovations of Carey Hall, the school's main building which houses the Upper School students. Carey Hall, named after Carey's grandmother, was constructed in 1910 and remained the same until late 2006. Carey donated 10 million dollars to the school's capital campaign fund, a sum that was one fifth of the total amount of money raised for the renovation of Carey Hall. On December 10, 2007, Carey Hall was officially re-opened as Carey cut the ribbon signaling the start of a new generation in a new, updated Carey Hall.

=== Arizona State University W. P. Carey School of Business ===
Carey was benefactor to the Arizona State University College of Business. In 2002, Carey donated $50 million to the College of Business. In recognition of his gift, the university renamed its business school the W. P. Carey School of Business.

=== The Johns Hopkins University Carey Business School ===
Carey announced December 5, 2006, his donation of $50 million to Johns Hopkins University. He was a trustee emeritus at Hopkins and donated the money through his W.P. Carey Foundation. The gift was the largest to Hopkins in support of business education and is now called the Carey Business School. The Hopkins business school will be named after William Carey's great-great-great-grandfather, James Carey. The school offers full- and part-time MBA programs, as well as specialized master's degree programs in finance, marketing, information systems, health care management, and enterprise risk management. The school's Master of Science in Real Estate program was one of the first in the Baltimore/Washington, D.C. corridor.

=== University of Maryland Francis King Carey School of Law ===
On April 25, 2011, Carey announced his donation of $30 million to The University of Maryland School of Law. The emphasis of the gift was to increase the school's endowment. The school is being named after Carey's grandfather, Francis King Carey, who was a graduate of the Law School (Class of 1880).

=== University of Pennsylvania Carey Law School ===
In 2019, The W. P. Carey Foundation donated $125 million to the University of Pennsylvania Law School, setting a new record as the largest gift to a law school. In recognition of the Foundation and its long-term involvement with Penn, the Penn Board of Trustees approved a resolution designating that the school would be named the University of Pennsylvania Carey Law School as of November 8, 2019. The name change, which the Carey Foundation and the University of Pennsylvania Law School had intended to take place simultaneously with the announcement of the gift, proved unpopular with students and alumni, thousands of whom quickly signed an online petition protesting the Foundation's decision to replace "Penn Law" with "Carey Law" as the law school's new "short form" name; in response to the backlash, the Law School and Foundation agreed to delay the full name-change to "Penn Carey Law" until the beginning of the 2022 Fall Term.
