= Dubai Pharmacy College =

Institution in the United Arab Emirates

Coordinates: 25°15′3″N 55°25′0″E

Dubai Pharmacy College for girls
- كلية دبي للصيدلة
- Type: Private
- Established: 1992
- Chairman: Saeed Bin Ahmed Al Lootah
- Dean: Prof.Saeed Ahmed Khan
- Location: Muhaisnah, Dubai, UAE
- Website: Official website

The Dubai Pharmacy College for Girls (DPCG) is the first pharmacy higher education institution in the United Arab Emirates, established in 1992 by Dubai philanthropist Haji Saeed Bin Ahmed Al Lootah. In 2005, it won the Dubai Quality Appreciation Programme award for education presented by Sheikh Mohammed bin Rashid Al Maktoum, Crown Prince of Dubai. The Dubai Pharmacy College offers Bachelor of Pharmacy (BPharm) and Master of Pharmacy (MPharm) program in clinical pharmacy. The BPharm and MPharm (clinical pharmacy) curriculum is accredited and licensed by the Ministry of Education-CAA" of UAE since 1998 for the BPharm program and accreditation since October 2013 for the Master of Pharmacy (MPharm) program specializing in clinical pharmacy and pharmaceutical product development. The Bachelor of Pharmacy degree program of Dubai Pharmacy College for Girls (DPCG) has been granted Certification (Category 1 and 2) by the Accreditation Council for Pharmacy Education (ACPE), from the US. (Accreditation Council for Pharmacy Education), 190 South LaSalle Street, Suite 2850, Chicago, Illinois 60603-3499, United States of America. The college has launched a new certificate course Post-graduate certificate program in healthcare business data analytics with an aim to provide a platform for healthcare professional and interdisciplinary researchers to learn about the fundamental principles, and applications of intelligent data acquisition, processing, and analysis of healthcare data.

In 2023, Emirates Health Services has partnered with Dubai Pharmacy College for Girls to enhance medical education and provide professional training.

== Pharmacy career opportunities in UAE ==
Dubai Pharmacy College for Girls offers a Bachelor of Pharmacy program designed to provide foundational training in pharmaceutical sciences. Additionally, the college offers a Master of Pharmacy (M.Pharm) in Clinical Pharmacy for female pharmacy graduates. The graduate program prepares students for careers in hospital clinical pharmacy, pharmaceutical industries, regulatory affairs, pharmacovigilance, medical insurance, academic research, and advanced doctoral studies.
