= American Society for the Prevention of Cruelty to Animals =

American nonprofit organization

- Abbreviation: ASPCA
- Formation: April 10, 1866
- Type: Non-profit
- Legal status: Foundation
- Purpose: Humane care for animals
- Headquarters: New York City
- Coordinates: 40°46′48.0″N 73°56′44.5″W
- Region served: United States
- Members: 1.2 million+
- Official language: English
- President & CEO: Matthew E. Bershadker
- Website: aspca.org

The American Society for the Prevention of Cruelty to Animals (ASPCA) is a non-profit organization dedicated to preventing animal cruelty. Based in New York City since its inception in 1866, the organization's mission is "to provide effective means for the prevention of cruelty to animals throughout the United States."

== History ==
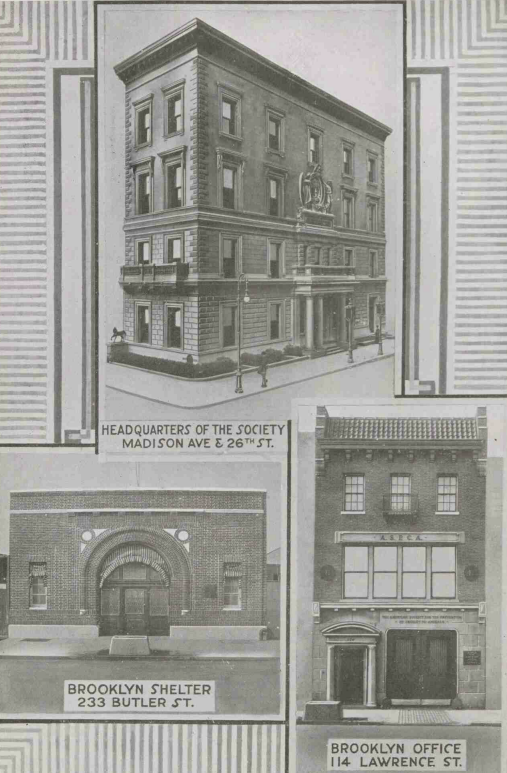
The ASPCA headquarters on Madison Avenue in 1920

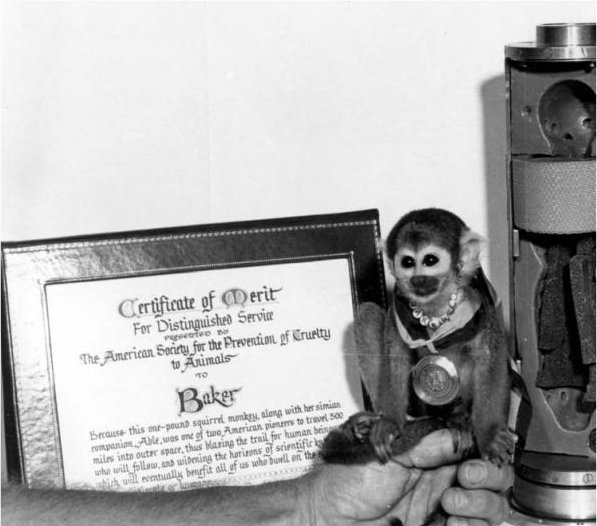
Miss Baker, a squirrel monkey, poses with the Certificate of Merit for Distinguished Service she was awarded by the ASPCA after her successful return to Earth, the associated medal, and the couch used for her 1959 flight (to the right). Baker and her traveling companion Able were the first animals to return alive from space.

Following the creation of the Royal Society for the Prevention of Cruelty to Animals (RSPCA) in the United Kingdom in 1824 (given Royal status in 1840), Henry Bergh founded the American Society for the Prevention of Cruelty to Animals on April 10, 1866, in New York City on the belief that "animals are entitled to kind and respectful treatment at the hands of humans, and must be protected under the law". It is the oldest animal welfare organization in the United States. On February 8, 1866, Bergh pleaded on behalf of animals at a meeting at Clinton Hall in New York City. Some of the issues he discussed were cockfighting and the horrors of slaughterhouses. After getting signatures for his "Declaration of the Rights of Animals," Bergh was given an official charter to incorporate the ASPCA on April 10, 1866. On April 19, 1866, the first anti-cruelty law was passed in NY since the founding of ASPCA, and the organization was granted the right to enforce anti-cruelty laws. In 1867, ASPCA operated its first ambulance for injured horses and began advocating for more humane treatment of animals such as horses, live pigeons, cats, and dogs. Early goals of ASPCA focused on efforts for horses and livestock, since at the time they were used for a number of activities.

In 1918, ASPCA veterinarians developed the use of anesthesia and as a result were able to work on a horse with a broken kneecap. In 1954, ASPCA hospitals added pathology and radiography laboratories and programs. In 1961, ASPCA veterinarians performed their first open-heart surgery on a dog.

From 1894 to 1994, the ASPCA operated the municipal animal shelter system in New York City which euthanized unadopted animals. Starting in 1977, the ASPCA entered into a contract with the New York City Department of Health to receive municipal funding to operate the shelter system. The contract rendered the ASPCA increasingly reliant on government income rather than private donations, and subject to the effects of annual city budget appropriations. In 1993, the ASPCA decided not to renew its contract for operating the shelter system. Operation of the shelter system was transferred to Center for Animal Care and Control, later renamed Animal Care Centers of NYC, in 1995.

In 1996, ASPCA acquired the Animal Poison Control Center from the University of Illinois. In 2013, the ASPCA made a $25 million commitment to assist at-risk animals and pet owners in the greater Los Angeles metropolitan area, including a fully subsidized spay/neuter facility in South Los Angeles operated by the ASPCA and a campaign to encourage the fostering of local vulnerable kittens.

In 2014, ASPCA spoke out in support of New York City's new mayor's (Bill de Blasio) campaign to ban horse-drawn carriages in the city.

In 2014, ASPCA opened the Gloria Gurney Canine Annex for Recovery & Enrichment (CARE) in NYC to house dogs brought by the NYPD to the ASPCA in connection with animal cruelty investigations. In 2014, ASPCA also opened the ASPCA Kitten Nursery in NYC to care for neonate and very young homeless kittens until they are appropriate for adoption.

In 2015, ASPCA acquired the Asheville, North Carolina–based Humane Alliance, now called the ASPCA Spay/Neuter Alliance.

In 2018, ASPCA established the ASPCA Behavioral Rehabilitation Center. Located in Weaverville, North Carolina, the Center provides behavioral rehabilitation to canine victims of cruelty and neglect. The center's Learning Lab also disseminates rehabilitative aid and training to shelters around the country.

In 2019, ASPCA opened the ASPCA Community Veterinary Center in Liberty City, Miami, Florida, to provide subsidized veterinary services for an underserved community. It also took over responsibility for The Right Horse Initiative as an official program of the ASPCA in 2019.

In 2020, ASPCA opened the ASPCA Community Veterinary Center in the Bronx, New York.

In 2020, ASPCA launched a series of programs in response to the COVID-19 pandemic and its effect on pets, owners, and communities including free pet food for dogs, cats, and horses in New York City, Los Angeles, Miami, and Asheville, grants to animal welfare organizations, emergency pet boarding services, a New York City COVID-19 Pet Hotline, and expanded stationary and mobile veterinary care.

In 2021, the Society opened the ASPCA Community Veterinary Center supported by the Alex and Elisabeth Lewyt Charitable Trust, in NYC.

As of 2023, ASPCA's New York hospital was treating 9,000–10,000 patients annually.

In 2023, ASPCA began releasing an annual report that grades major grocery retailers in the United States on their policies around animal welfare, such as selling cage-free eggs and pork raised without gestation crates.

== Controversy ==
ASPCA Humane Law Enforcement Division patch

An ASPCA fundraising commercial featuring the song Angel by Sarah McLachlan began airing in early 2007. By December 2008, it had raised more than $30 million for the ASPCA, becoming the organization's most successful fundraising campaign. The New York Times reported that the spot became known as "The Ad" in non-profit circles.

In 2021, CBS News reported that the ad misled donors, who believed that their financial contributions supported local SPCAs and animal welfare charities. The CBS News investigation focused on "questions about whether the money is going where donors expect," reporting the ASPCA raised $2 billion for animal welfare between 2008 and 2019 and spent only $146 million in grants to local animal welfare groups. In response, a spokesperson for the ASPCA said that donors were aware that the ASPCA was not an umbrella organization for local organizations with SPCA in their names.

After the CBS News piece aired, two widely-shared posts on Facebook claimed that the ASPCA's CEO was paid $600,000 annually, and that only 3 cents of each dollar donated were used "for veterinary supplies and for transporting the animals". USA Today fact-checked the posts and found that based on ASPCA tax filings, 34.4% of the ASPCA's budget was used for shelter and veterinary care, and an average of 75.1% of expenses were used to support its mission statement.

== Legislation and litigation ==
In 2012, the ASPCA agreed to pay Ringling Bros. and Barnum & Bailey Circus $9.3 million to settle a lawsuit regarding the ASPCA's false allegations of animal cruelty by the circus. Courts found that ASPCA activists had paid the key witness, a former Ringling barn helper, at least $190,000, making him "essentially a paid plaintiff" who lacked credibility. Edwin J. Sayres stepped down as CEO in 2012, and in 2013 longtime ASPCA staff member Matthew Bershadker was named president and CEO.

The ASPCA's Government Relations, Legal Advocacy and Investigations departments work with state and federal lawmakers and engage in legislative and litigation efforts to secure stronger legal protections for animals.

Some of the animal welfare issues the departments work on include ending puppy mills and breed-specific legislation.

In 2019, the ASPCA sued the U.S. Department of Agriculture for access to animal breeder inspection records. The filed lawsuit claimed that Defendants-Appellees the U.S. Department of Agriculture and the Animal and Plant Health Inspection Service (“APHIS”) followed a "policy or practice" of violating FOIA for failing to comply with requests for records related to the agency response to maintenance of animal welfare standards and licensing of animal dealers/exhibitors.

ASPCA was among the animal welfare groups that supported the "puppy mill pipeline" bill in New York, which was signed by Governor Kathy Hochul on December 15, 2022. The law went into effect in 2024 and makes it illegal to sell dogs, cats, and rabbits in pet stores in New York. The organization's senior director of state legislation said the law is needed because many puppies are imported from other states where New York does not have jurisdiction to inspect the conditions in the breeding facility.

== National cruelty and field response ==
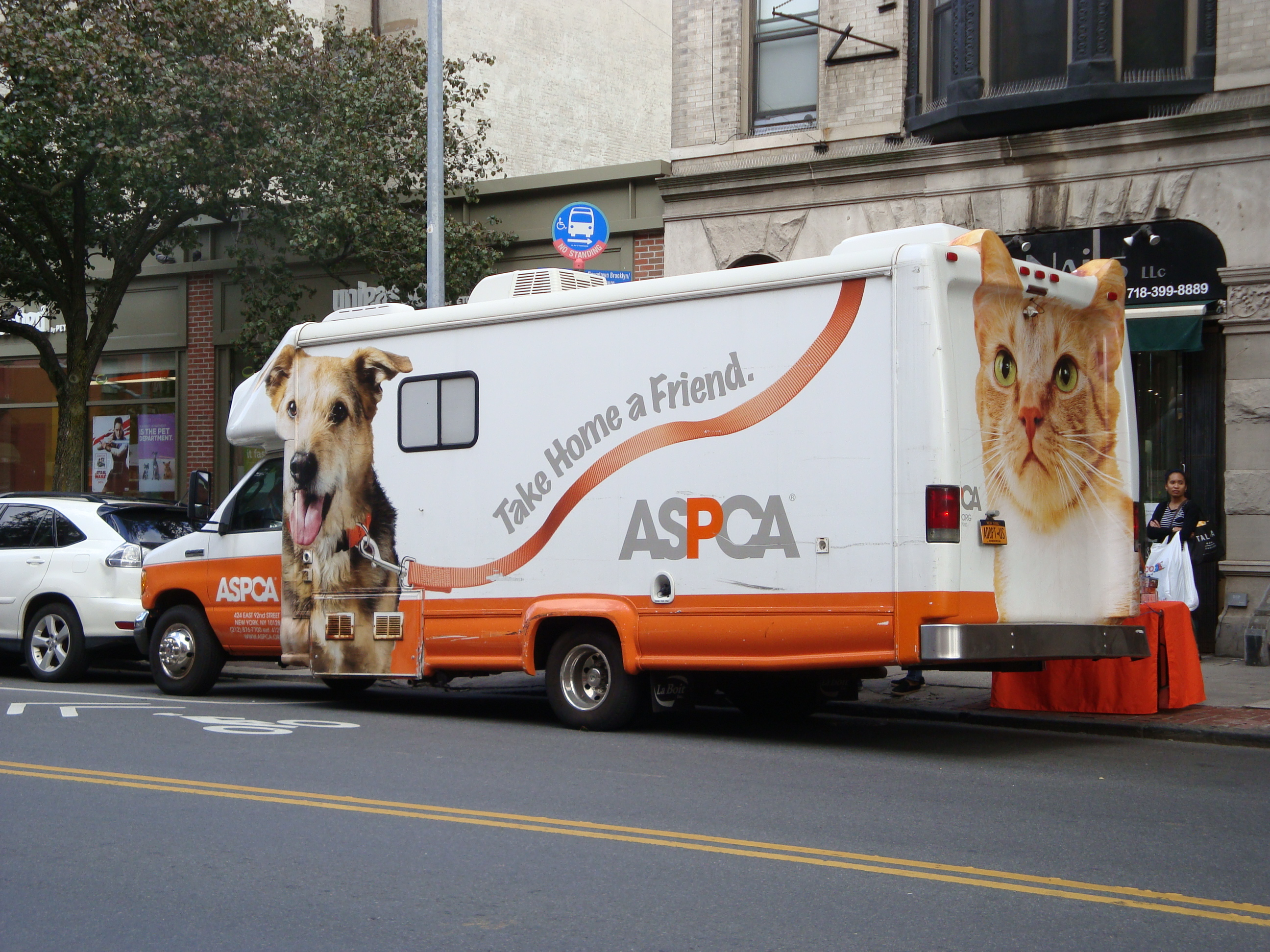
Vehicle for pet adoption, in Brooklyn, New York

At the invitation of local agencies, ASPCA deploys to sites of large-scale animal abuse, animal neglect, natural disasters, or man-made disasters in which animals are at risk. Teams, including National Field Response, Legal Advocacy and Investigations, Forensic Sciences, the Cruelty Recovery Center, Relocation and the Behavioral Sciences team, engage in animal rescue efforts. They provide behavioral and medical treatment for the animals and support the prosecution of criminal cases with forensic science, evidence collection and analysis, and legal and expert testimony support.

Cases involving torture, killings and mistreatment of animals are some examples of cases handled by the ASPCA. A common example was displayed in the news in October 2008, when ASPCA was in charge of an investigation involving the slaughtering of a beagle that lived in the Bronx.

In 2016, ASPCA field deployment teams participated in a large animal cruelty rescue operation, rescuing nearly 700 animals from an unlicensed facility in North Carolina.

Other large-scale ASPCA rescues included providing emergency sheltering and assistance for approximately 1,300 animals displaced during the Joplin tornado in 2011 and assisting with the care of 367 dogs in Alabama, Mississippi and Georgia in 2013, in what has been believed to be the second-largest dogfighting raid in U.S. history.

In September 2013, after many years of providing humane law enforcement services in NYC, the ASPCA and the New York City Police Department announced a collaboration to provide enhanced protection to New York City's animals. In this partnership, the NYPD responds to all animal cruelty complaints throughout New York City, while the ASPCA provides medical and behavioral care for animal cruelty victims and provides legal and forensic assistance in the prosecution of cases. The ASPCA Community Engagement team also works closely with the NYPD to connect pets in need to services such as medical care, grooming and pet supplies.

In 2020, ASPCA also opened the ASPCA Veterinary Forensic Science Center in Gainesville, Florida, to assist law enforcement with animal cruelty investigations and prosecutions.

=== Dogfighting ===
Between 2010 and 2025, ASPCA helped investigate 300 dogfighting cases that resulted in the rescue of 6,000 dogs.

In 2013, ASPCA cared for 367 dogs that were rescued from Alabama, Mississippi, Georgia and Texas from what was the second largest dogfighting ring in the United States to date. The organization sheltered the dogs in an air conditioned, converted warehouse, providing medical and behavioral rehabilitation. Alabama Media Group reported that none of the dogs had to be euthanized.

The organization partnered with the National Museum of Crime and Punishment to provide items for an exhibit on dogfighting in 2013.

ASPCA worked with the Kansas Bureau of Investigation in 2018 to rescue 45 dogs and nine puppies from a dogfighting ring in Bendena, Kansas. The investigation also included the organization uncovering dogfighting paraphernalia, like treadmills and chains.

In 2025, ASPCA partnered with the State of South Carolina to prosecute dogfighting rings and issued 15 related search warrants. In March of that year, it sheltered and cared for 28 dogs rescued from a single dogfighting ring in Luzerne County.

=== Disaster Relief ===
Following natural disasters, ASPCA provides on the ground assistance providing displaced animals food and shelter. It also provides grants for other organizations to invest in climate-related disaster preparedness, such as purchasing emergency supplies, power generators, and animal transport units.

ASPCA reported assisting at least 550 animals following Hurricane Florence. After a Hurricane in Monroe County, Mississippi, the organization partnered with local human societies and Mississippi State University's veterinary program to relocate and give animals medical checks. In 2024, after Hurricane Helene its disaster response team provided pet supplies, medication, and veterinary support to affected communities in Florida, Georgia, and North Carolina. ASPCA partnered with a Texas-based animal response team to evacuate over 100 displaced animals after storm-related flooding damaged a shelter at Pilot Point, Texas. It provided shelter as well as medical and behavioral care for the animals.

Following the 2025 California wildfires, ASPCA announced a $5 million dollar fund for animal welfare organizations in Los Angeles county.

== Welfare of farm animals and horses ==
The ASPCA's Farm Animal Welfare Program features a "Shop With Your Heart" campaign that guides consumers on making animal welfare-conscious food buying decisions including seeking out meat, egg, and dairy products certified by one of three credible animal welfare certifications, including Global Animal Partnership (GAP), and exploring more plant-based food options.

The ASPCA's Right Horse Initiative is focused on increasing the number of successful horse adoptions in the U.S. and improving the number of positive outcomes for horses in transition as they move from one home, career, or owner to the next.

== Animal relocation ==
ASPCA works with other animal welfare organizations and rescue groups to relocate animals from areas with high rates of euthanasia in animal shelters to locations with higher adoption rates. Often, animals are moved from the southern to northern U.S. states. Animals may be transported using aircraft or vehicles, sometimes being relayed between transporters multiple times along the way. As of March 2022, ASPCA had a fleet of 18 vans used for transport. The organization relocated approximately 200,000 animals between 2017 and 2022.

== Behaviour rehabilitation centers ==
ASPCA operates centers where dogs that have experienced abuse or trauma receive treatment and behavior rehabilitation before being cleared for adoption. As of 2022, the organization has committed $40 million to building and operating the centers, which are located in Weaverville, North Carolina, Columbus, Ohio, with another being developed in Pawling, New York. The Weaverville center opened in 2020 and was the world's first clinic for treating dogs that have been severely traumatized. The concept was conceived in 2010 by two ASPCA behaviorists as a way to reduce the number of dogs that are euthanized in shelters for behavior issues. The organization piloted the program in 2013 at a temporary site in Madison, New Jersey and reported that approximately 90 percent of the dogs treated recovered enough to be adopted. In 2014, ASPCA purchased land in Weaverville where it built the center. As of July 2022, the Weaverville center had 35 full-time staff, and had rehabilitated 500 dogs since opening.

== Publications ==
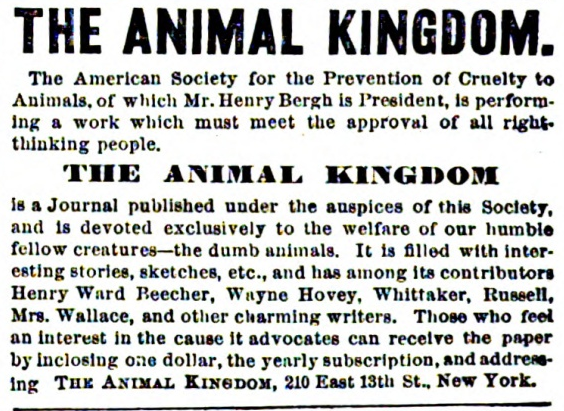
ASPCA's The Animal Kingdom magazine advert, 1874

The ASPCA published The Animal Kingdom magazine in the 1870s which became Our Animal Friends: An Illustrated Monthly Magazine in the 1890s. The magazine featured articles from well known authors of the day, including Louisa May Alcott and Harriet Beecher Stowe. It was renamed Animal Protection (1947–1977) and later became ASPCA Bulletin (1977–1981), ASPCA Quarterly Report (1981–1989), ASPCA Report (1989–1992) and Animal Watch: The Magazine of the American Society for the Prevention of Cruelty to Animals (1993–2004). In 1964, Lloyd Alexander authored their history, Fifty Years in the Doghouse which was commissioned by the ASPCA.

Copies of the ASPCA's magazine Animal Protection are digitized and stored at NC State University Libraries. The ASPCA currently publishes the ASPCA Action magazine.

== Presidents and chairpersons ==
ASPCA Presidents
Henry Bergh	1866–1888
James M. Brown	1888–1889
John P. Haines	1889–1906
William K. Horton	1907–1929
William E. Bevan	1929–1937
Eugene Berlinghoff	1935–1953
Warren W. McSpadden	1953–1958
Arthur L. Amundsen	1958–1961
William Mapel	1960–1972
Encil E. Rains	1972–1977
Duncan Wright	1977–1978
John F. Kullberg, Ed.D.	1978–1991
Roger A. Caras	1991–1998
Larry M. Hawk, D.V.M.	1999–2003
Edwin J. Sayres	2003 – May 31, 2013
Matthew E. Bershadker	From June 1, 2013

ASPCA Chairpersons
Henry Bergh	1866–1888
Henry Bergh Jr.	1888–1889
John P. Haines	1889–1906
Alfred Wagstaff	1906–1921
Frank K. Sturgis	1921–1931
George M. Woolsey	1931–1937
Alexander S. Webb	1937–1947
John D. Beals Jr.	1947–1952
Hugh E. Paine	1952–1955
William A. Rockefeller	1955–1963
James H. Jenkins	1963–1969
John F. Thompson Jr.	1969–1971
Charles S. Haines	1971–1973
Alastair B. Martin	1973–1976
Louis F. Bishop III	1976–1979
Marvin Schiller	1979–1981
George W. Gowen	1981–1983
Thomas N. McCarter III	1983–1995
James F. Stebbins	1995–1997
Steven M. Elkman	1997–2003
Hoyle C. Jones	2003–2009
Marsha P. Perelman	2009–2011
Mary Jo White	2011–2012
Tim Wray	2012–2016
Fred Tanne	2016–2020
Sally Spooner	From 2020

== See also ==
- Humane Society of the United States
- List of animal welfare organizations
