= Bernard T. Ferrari =

Dean of the Carey Business School at Johns Hopkins University
- In office July 1, 2012 – July 1, 2019
- Preceded by: Yash P. Gupta
- Succeeded by: Alexander Triantis

Personal details
- Born: Rochester, New York, U.S.
- Spouse: Linda Ferrari
- Education: University of Rochester
- Profession: Dean Emeritus
- Website: carey.jhu.edu/faculty-research/faculty-directory/bernard-ferrari
- Books: Power Listening: Mastering the Most Critical Business Skill of All

Bernard T. Ferrari is the second and former dean of the Carey Business School of the Johns Hopkins University.

== Early life and education ==
Ferrari is a cum laude graduate of the University of Rochester from which he also received his M.D. He earned a J.D. magna cum laude from Loyola University School of Law and an M.B.A. from Tulane University Freeman School of Business.

== Career ==
Ferrari's appointment at the Carey Business School began on July 1, 2012. Ferrari has more than twenty years' of experience as a partner and senior healthcare consultant at the global management consulting firm McKinsey & Company, where he headed the firm's healthcare practice and its North American corporate strategy practice. Prior to joining McKinsey, he was chief operating officer and assistant medical director of the Ochsner Clinic in New Orleans.

Under Ferrari's leadership of the Johns Hopkins Carey Business School, the school earned accreditation from the Association to Advance Collegiate Schools of Business (AACSB), experienced tremendous growth with increased student enrollment, added more full-time faculty, and established new graduate degree programs. He also organized Carey's academic and research initiatives under four key domains: Risk Management, Health Care Management, Real Estate and Infrastructure, and Financial Services.

Bernard T. Ferrari retired on July 1, 2019, as the dean of Johns Hopkins Carey Business School, and was succeeded by Alexander Triantis.

Following his retirement Ferrari was named dean emeritus of the Carey Business School. The distinction was approved by the university's board of trustees and announced by JHU Provost Sunil Kumar at Ferraris farewell in June 2019. Ferrari is the author of the book Power Listening - Mastering the Most Critical Business Skill of All which was published in 2012. The book intends to show readers a process which will help them become active listeners, able to shape and focus any conversation.

In 2024, Johns Hopkins Carey Business School established the endowed Bernard T. Ferrari Professorship.

== Personal life ==
He is married to Linda Ferrari, a former commercial banker and active docent at the Metropolitan Museum of Art in New York.
