= Manufacturing & Service Operations Management =

Manufacturing & Service Operations Management (M&SOM)
- Discipline: Operations Management
- Language: English
- Edited by: Christopher S. Tang

Publication details
- History: 1999-present
- Publisher: Institute for Operations Research and the Management Sciences
- Frequency: Quarterly
- Impact factor: 4.281 (2019)

Standard abbreviations
- ISO 4: Manuf. Serv. Oper. Manag.

Indexing
- CODEN: MSOMFV
- ISSN: 1523-4614 (print); 1526-5498 (web)
- LCCN: sn99008226
- OCLC no.: 60637557

Links
- Journal homepage; Online access; Online archive

Manufacturing & Service Operations Management is a bi-monthly peer-reviewed academic journal established in 1999 that is published by the Institute for Operations Research and the Management Sciences. It covers analytical research about operations management in the manufacturing/service industry. According to the Journal Citation Reports, the journal has a 2019 impact factor of 4.281.

Over the first three quarters in 2020, the number of M&SOM downloads exceeded 100,000.

== Editors-in-chief ==
The following persons are, or have been, editors-in-chief:

- 2021-present: Georgia Perakis, MIT
- 2015–2020: Christopher S. Tang, UCLA
- 2009–2014: Stephen C. Graves, MIT
- 2005–2009: Gérard Cachon, UPenn
- 2003–2005: Garrett J. van Ryzin, Columbia University
- 1999–2003: Leroy Schwarz, Purdue University
