= Sales force compensation =

"The incentive plan needs to align the salesperson’s activities with the firm’s objectives." Toward that end, an effective plan may be based on the past (growth), the present (comparison with others), or the future (percentage of goal achieved).

== Purpose ==
The purpose of the sales force compensation metric is to determine the mix of salary, bonus, and commission that will maximize sales generated by the sales force. When designing a compensation plan for a sales force, managers face four key considerations: level of pay, mix between salary and incentive, measures of performance, and performance-payout relationships. The level of pay, or compensation, is the amount that a company plans to pay a salesperson over the course of a year. This can be viewed as a range, because its total will vary with bonuses or commissions.

== Construction ==
Managers enjoy considerable freedom in designing compensation systems. The key is to start with a forecast for sales and a range within which each salesperson's compensation should reside. After these elements are determined, there are many ways to motivate a salesperson. Key formulas in this area include the following:

Compensation ($) = Salary ($) + Bonus 1 ($) + Bonus 2 ($)
Compensation ($) = Salary ($) + [Sales ($) x Commission (%)]

== Break-even number of employees ==
After a sales compensation plan has been established, management may want to reevaluate the size of its sales force. Based on forecasts for the coming year, the firm may have room to hire more salespeople, or it may need to reduce the size of the sales force. On the basis of a given value for projected sales, managers can determine the break-even number of employees for a firm as follows:

Breakeven number of employees (#) = {Sales ($) x [Margin (%) - Commission (%)]} ÷ ({Salary ($) + Expenses ($) + Bonus ($)})

== See also ==
- Performance-related pay
