= List of Loyola University Maryland people =

Here follows a list of notable alumni, faculty, administrators, or people affiliated with Loyola University Maryland.

== List ==
Selected Loyola alumni

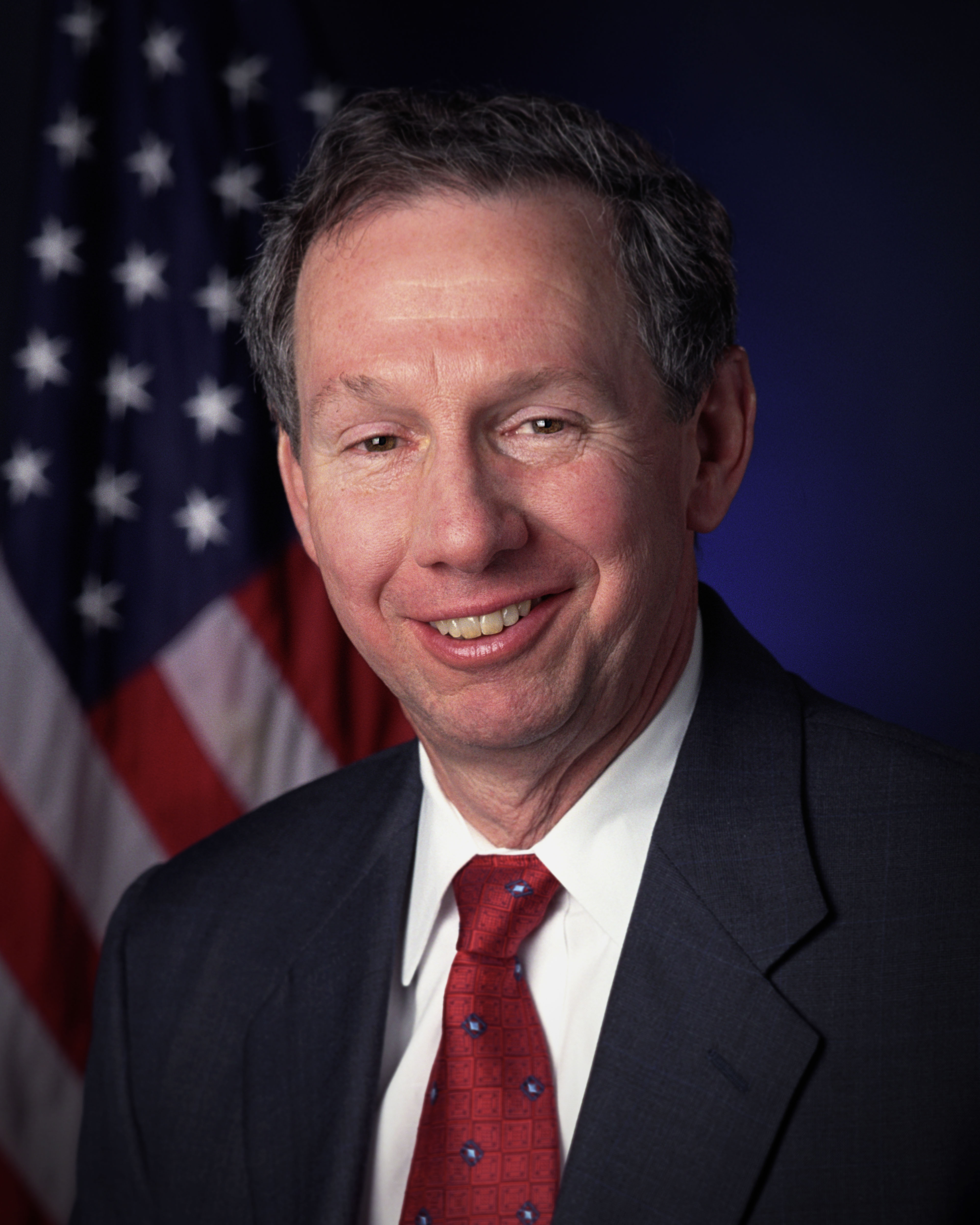
Michael D. Griffin, NASA administrator

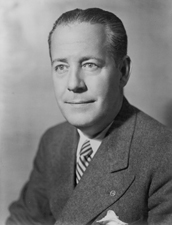
Herbert O'Conor, 51st governor of Maryland

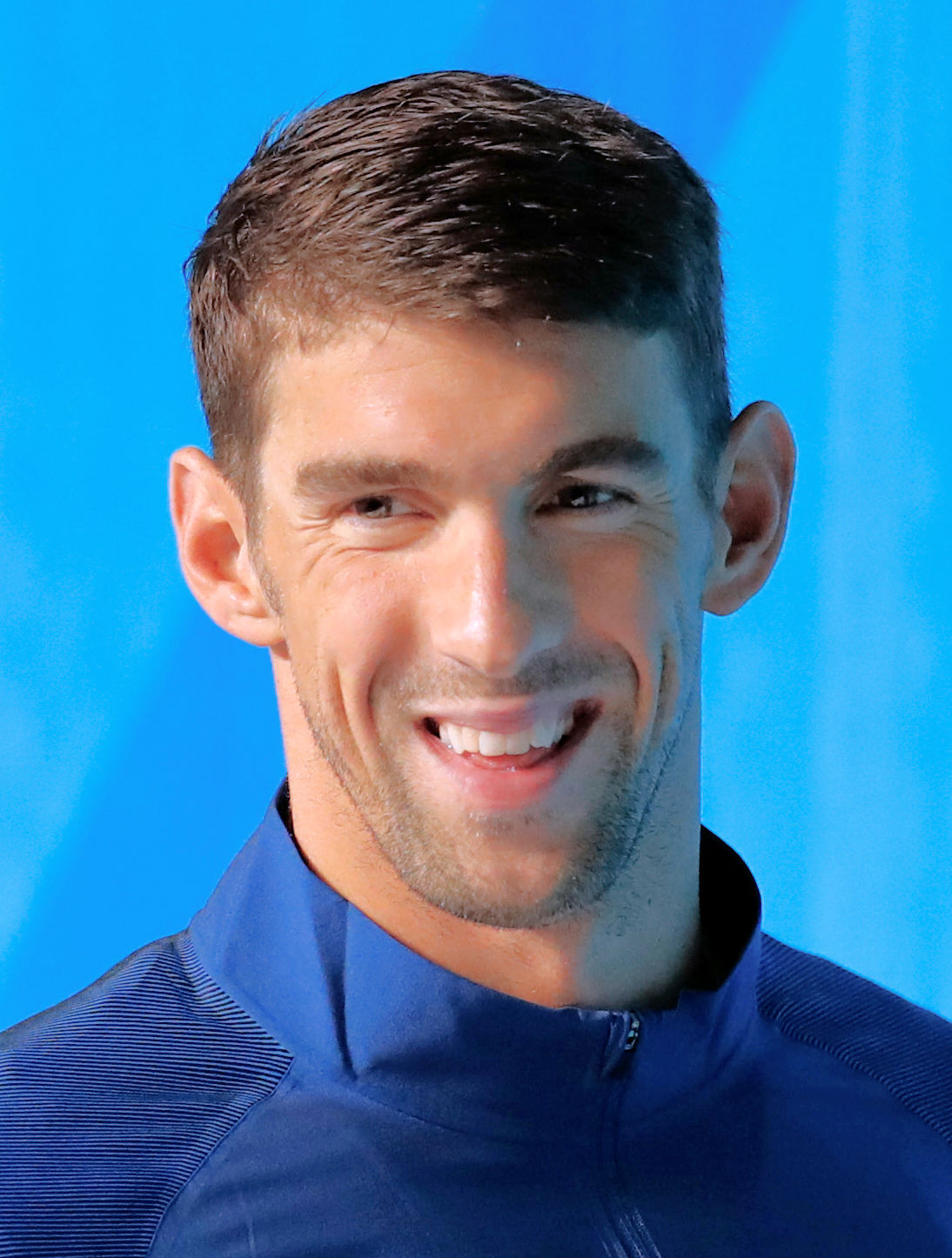
Michael Phelps, swimmer

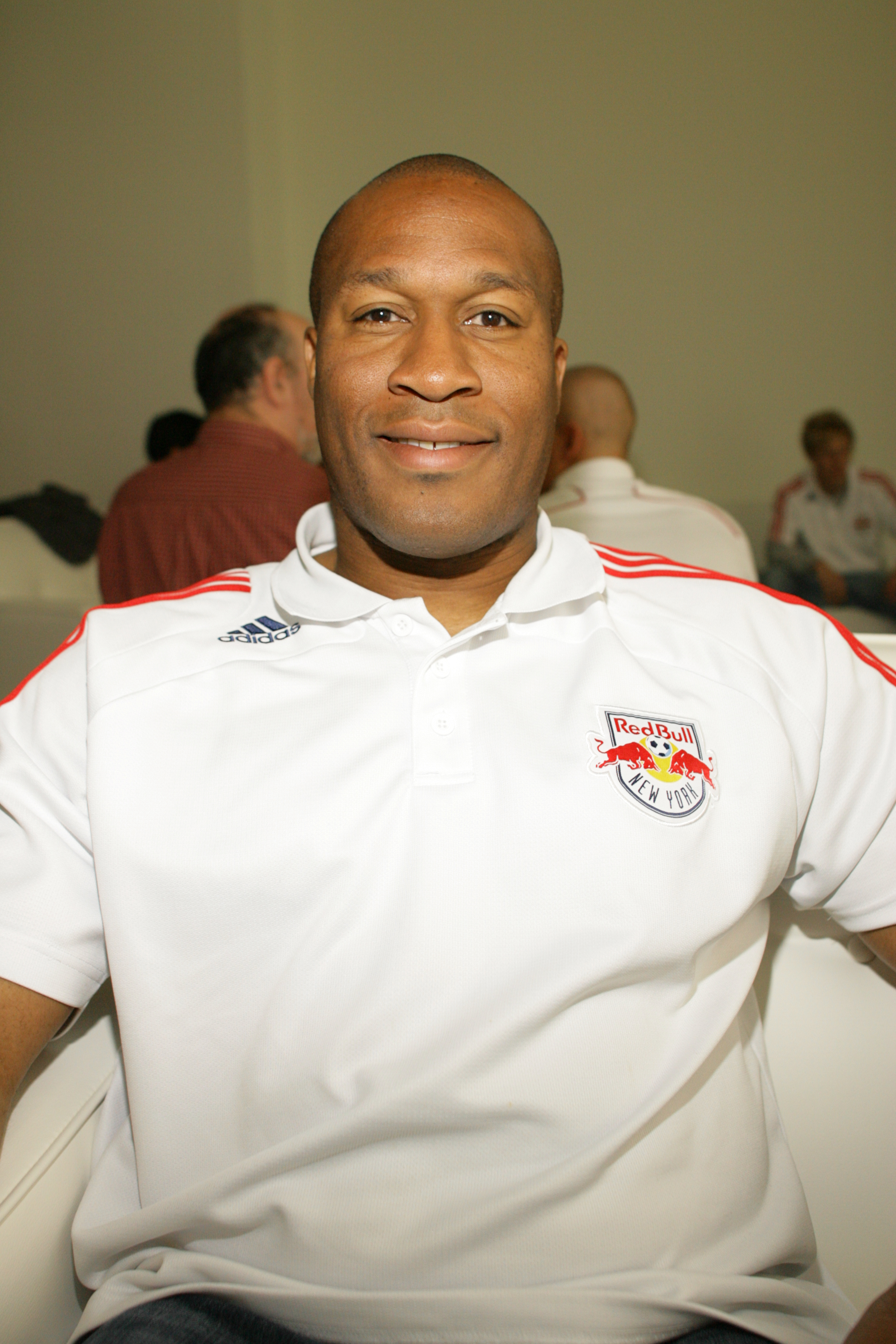
Zach Thornton, soccer goalkeeper

=== Academic ===
- Jason J. Corso, professor of Robotics and Electrical Engineering & Computer Science, University of Michigan
- Emory Elliott, professor of American literature and advocate for expanding the literary canon to include a more diverse range of voices
- Aloysius C. Galvin, S.J., former Loyola College dean, 17th president of the University of Scranton

=== Business ===
- Chris Dessi, writer and business executive
- Harry Markopolos (1981), former chief investment officer of Rampart Investment Management Co. and early whistleblower of Bernard Madoff

=== Judges ===
- Robert A. Zarnoch, judge of the Maryland Court of Special Appeals

=== Politicians ===
- Robert C. Baldwin, former Maryland delegate
- Alessandra Biaggi (born 1986), New York state senator
- Francis B. Burch (1941), former attorney general of Maryland
- Edward H. Burke (1886–1955), state delegate and lawyer
- Andrew J. Burns Jr. (1950), former Maryland delegate
- Jill P. Carter, member, Maryland Senate
- Edward L. Cochran (1949), Howard County executive, 1974–1978
- Jean B. Cryor (1979), former Maryland delegate
- Terry R. Gilleland, Jr., former member of Maryland House of Delegates
- Hugh Meade (1929), U.S. congressman for Maryland 2nd District, 1947–1949
- Barbara Mikulski (Mount Saint Agnes College, 1958), United States senator from Maryland, 1987–2017
- John S. Morgan (1984), former member of Maryland House of Delegates, 1991–1999
- Herbert O'Conor (1917), governor of Maryland 1939–1947, United States senator 1947–1953
- Michael Peroutka, former Constitution Party candidate for president
- Dennis F. Rasmussen (1970), Baltimore County executive, 1986–1990
- Bryan Simonaire (2005), Maryland state senator

=== Religion ===
- Soane Patita Paini Mafi, Catholic bishop and cardinal of Tonga
- Joseph C. Martin, Roman Catholic priest, recovering alcoholic and renowned speaker/educator on the issues of alcoholism and drug addiction
- Noah Weinberg, rabbi

=== Science ===
- Brendan Carr, Endowed System Chair of Emergency Medicine at the Icahn School of Medicine at Mount Sinai
- Edwin A. Fleishman, notable scientist and author
- Michael D. Griffin, administrator of NASA
- Bradley M. Kuhn, former executive director of the Free Software Foundation, Phi Beta Kappa Society 1995
- Elena Plante, speech-language pathologist and head of the Department of Speech, Language, and Hearing Sciences at the University of Arizona

=== Arts and literature ===
- Isaac Rieman Baxley, poet
- Mark Bowden, B.A. 1973, journalist and author (Black Hawk Down)
- Ed Burns, producer, screenwriter, and novelist; co-creator with writing partner David Simon of The Corner and The Wire (HBO); former Baltimore police detective for the Homicide and Narcotics divisions; public school teacher
- Tom Clancy, B.A. 1969, author
- George Herman, B.A. 1950, playwright (A Company of Wayward Saints)
- Deborah Rudacille, writer
- Susan Schulz, B.A. 1993, communications consultant and former magazine editor
- Steven B. Smith, poet
- Margaret E. Ward, Irish journalist and broadcaster

=== Sports ===
- Santi Aldama, NBA player for the Dallas Mavericks
- Michael Burke, former soccer player
- Paul Cantabene (1993), former professional lacrosse player; head coach of Stevenson University's men's lacrosse team
- Frank Cashen (1945), General Manager of the Baltimore Orioles and New York Mets, won 1986 World Series
- Harry Child, former Major League Baseball pitcher for the Washington Senators
- Diane Geppi-Aikens (1984), women's college lacrosse coach
- Katie Hoff, swimmer who holds the world record for the women's 400m individual medley; former student and volunteer assistant swimming coach
- Milos Kocic (2008), goalkeeper for D.C. United and Toronto FC
- Michael Malone, North Carolina Tar Heels men's basketball head coach from 2026; Denver Nuggets head coach from 2015–2025, including 2023 NBA Championship
- James McManus, professionally known as Jim McKay (1943), sportscaster most famous as host of Wide World of Sports from 1961–1998
- Doug Miller, former professional soccer player; current youth soccer coach
- Gordie Mueller, relief pitcher for the Boston Red Sox who played only one season in 1950
- Jimmy Patsos, former head men's basketball coach, 2004–2013
- Michael Phelps, most decorated Olympian of all time, with 28 Olympic medals; former volunteer assistant swimming coach
- Skip Prosser, former men's basketball coach, 1993–94
- Philip Scholz, S-11 category swimmer; set multiple American Paralympic records
- Cam Spencer, NBA player for the Memphis Grizzlies
- Pat Spencer, NBA player for the Phoenix Suns and 2019 Tewaaraton Award winner
- Zach Thornton (1998), goalkeeper for the New York/New Jersey MetroStars, Chicago Fire and Chivas USA
- Joe Wise, Paralympian swimmer
- Dennis Wit, retired U.S. national soccer player

=== Music ===
- Jeleel, rapper and singer
- Charlie Murphy, singer-songwriter and political activist
- David Villa, singer and songwriter for Silver Edition
- Jah Works, roots reggae band formed by a group of Loyola students on a study abroad program in Belgium
