= Dell'Acqua =

Dell'Acqua is an Italian surname. Notable people with the surname include:

- Gaspare dell'Acqua (active circa 1460), Italian painter of the Renaissance period, active mainly in Genoa and Pavia
- Alberto Dell'Acqua (born 1938), Italian stuntman and actor
- Alessandro Dell'Acqua (born 1962), Italian fashion designer
- Angelo Dell'Acqua (1903–1972), Italian Roman Catholic cardinal
- Arturo Dell'Acqua Bellavitis (born 1947), the current director of the Milan Triennale Foundation and Exposition
- Casey Dellacqua (born 1985), Australian tennis player
- Cesare Dell'Acqua (1821–1905), Italian painter
- Eva Dell'Acqua (1856–1930), Belgian singer and composer
- Massimo Dell'Acqua (born 1979), Italian professional tennis player
- Simone Dell'Acqua (born 1989), Italian footballer
