= Bellavitis =

Bellavitis is a surname. Notable people with the surname include:

- Giusto Bellavitis (1803–1880), Italian mathematician
- Arturo Dell'Acqua Bellavitis (born 1947), Italian art curator
