= Harold Ridley (Jesuit) =

American Jesuit

Harold Edward "Hap" Ridley SJ (June 20, 1939 – January 18, 2005) was the 23rd President of Loyola College in Maryland from July 1, 1994, until his death.

== Early life and career ==
Born in Jersey City, New Jersey, he joined the Jesuits in 1956, and was ordained as a Roman Catholic priest in 1969. Ridley was educated at Fordham University, Woodstock College and the Union Theological Seminary. He earned his Ph.D. in English literature from New York University.

Before becoming president of Loyola, Fr. Ridley taught at Regis High School in New York City from 1963 to 1966, and then at the Maryland Institute College of Art from 1967 to 1968. After MICA, taught at Le Moyne College for more than 20 years, where he also served as English Department Chair and Chief Academic Officer.

He took over as president of Loyola following the death of long-time president Fr. Joseph A. Sellinger, SJ.

== Service at Loyola ==
Fr. Ridley oversaw a period of rampant expansion for Loyola. During his tenure, annual admission applications rose from 4,500 to over 7,000. The facilities of the college were strengthened as well, with graduate centers opening in Columbia and Timonium, the construction of the Sellinger School of Business and Management, the renovation of Maryland Hall, and the opening of the Fitness and Aquatic Center.

He died suddenly the night of January 18, 2005. He was survived by his mother, Mrs. Harold Ridley, his sister Judy and brother John. Dr. David Haddad served as interim president until the appointment of Fr. Brian F. Linnane, SJ as president.

== Other affiliations ==
Fr. Ridley served on the boards of the College of the Holy Cross, Crown Central Petroleum, the Institute for Christian & Jewish Studies, Fordham University, St. Peter's College, the University of Scranton, Loyola Blakefield, the American Council on Education, and the NCAA President's Commission.

== Notes ==
Academic offices
Preceded by Joseph A. Sellinger, S.J.	President of Loyola College in Maryland; 1994–2005	Succeeded by Brian F. Linnane, S.J.
