= Harold Ridley =

Harold Ridley may refer to:

- Harold Ridley (ophthalmologist) (1906–2001), English ophthalmologist
- Harold Ridley (Jesuit) (1939–2005), college president
