= Corso (surname) =

Corso is a surname. Notable people with the surname include:

- Bill Corso, American makeup artist
- Daniel Corso (born 1978), Canadian hockey player
- Giovanni Corso (boen 1977), Italian surgeon
- Gregory Corso (1930–2001), American poet, member of the Beat Generation
- Jason J. Corso, American professor of electrical engineering and computer science
- Lee Corso (born 1935), American sportscaster and former college football coach
- Liza Corso (born 2003), American Paralympic athlete
- Mario Corso (1941–2020), Italian footballer and coach
- Niccolò Corso (1446 – ca. 1512), Italian painter of the Renaissance
- Philip J. Corso (1915–1998), American Army officer
- Raffaele Corso (1885–1965), Italian ethnographer, folklorist and anthropologist

Fictional characters:

- Dean Corso, the main character in The Ninth Gate
- Lucas Corso, the main character in The Club Dumas
- Jace Corso, a character in the Canadian science fiction series Dark Matter
- Rosario Corso, a Season 2 contestant in Fetch! with Ruff Ruffman
