= Elena Plante =

Speech-language pathologist

- Born: 1961 (age 64–65)
- Occupations: Professor of Speech, Language, and Hearing Sciences
- Awards: 2018 ASHA Honors

Academic background
- Education: Loyola University (B.A., M.S.) University of Arizona (Ph.D.)

Academic work
- Discipline: Speech-Language Pathology
- Institutions: University of Arizona
- Main interests: Neurogenic communication disorders

Elena Margaret Plante (born 1961) is a researcher and speech-language pathologist specializing in developmental language disorders in children and adults. She holds the position of Professor and previously was Head of the Department of Speech, Language, and Hearing Sciences (SLHS) at the University of Arizona (UA). She is the principal investigator at the eponymous Plante Laboratory at UA. Plante is also affiliated with the Cognitive Science program at UA.

In 2018, Plante received Honors of the American Speech-Language-Hearing Association (ASHA) at their annual convention.

Plante is co-author (with Pelagie M. Beeson) of the textbook Communication and Communication Disorders: A Clinical Introduction. She also co-authored Human Communication and its Disorders (with Daniel Boone).

== Biography ==
The second of five children, Elena Margaret Plante was born in 1961 in Baltimore, Maryland, to Kenneth Louis and Carmen (née Hechmer) Plante.

Plante received her Bachelor of Arts in Speech-Language Pathology from Loyola University Maryland (formerly Loyola College) in 1984. In 1985, Plante completed her Master of Science, also in Speech-Language Pathology, at the same university. Plante received her Ph.D. in Speech and Hearing Science with a minor in Neuroscience at UA in 1990. Completed under the supervision of pediatrician Anna Binkiewicz, Plante's dissertation, "Cerebral configurations among the parents and siblings of language-disordered boys," analyzed the neuroanatomy of four language-impaired children and provided evidence for the theory that language impairments have a genetic basis.

From 1990 to 1992, Plante was a postdoctoral fellow in Speech and Hearing Science at UA before joining the faculty of the department. With her colleague Rebecca Vance, Plante runs Talk MOORE, a six-week summer camp for preschool-age children with speech and language impairments. Children in the program are exposed to structured, individualized therapies and group activities designed to improve reading readiness. Much of her research at UA aims to develop effective therapies for children with developmental language disorders; this work has been funded by grants from the National Institute of Health.

In 2018, Plante was elected to serve as the Vice President for Science and Research of the 2019 ASHA Board of Directors.

== Research ==
Plante is a co-author of the Test of Integrated Language & Literacy Skills (TILLS) (with Nickola Nelson, Nancy Helm-Estabrooks, and Gillian Hotz). The TILLS is a standardized assessment tool with fifteen subtests that is used to evaluate language and literacy skills and associated deficits in listening, reading, writing, and speaking skills. With her colleagues, Plante developed the Pediatric Test of Brain Injury (PTBI), a standardized assessment tool used to measure deficits in school readiness after brain injury in children ages 6–16.

Plante and her colleagues' articles have won three Editor's Awards from the ASHA journals in which they were published. This award is given annually to the most meritorious single article that appeared in the journal in the previous year. Plante and her colleagues Tammy J. Spaulding and Kimberly A. Farinella were honored in 2007 for their article, "Eligibility criteria for language impairment: Is the low end of normal always appropriate?" published in Language, Speech, and Hearing Services in Schools (LSHSS). This paper outlined difficulties associated with the use of low scores on standardized tests as a means of identifying children with language impairments, and emphasized how sensitivity and specificity rates may assist clinicians in making accurate diagnoses.

Plante and her coauthors Janne von Koss Torkildsen, Natalie S. Dailey, Jessica M. Aguilar, and Rebecca Gómez received the 2014 Editor's Award for "Exemplar variability facilitates rapid learning of an otherwise unlearnable grammar by individuals with language-based learning disability," published in the Journal of Speech, Language, and Hearing Research. This paper replicated and extended previous research demonstrating the importance of exemplar variation in supporting generalization of the grammatical patterns of an artificial language. Plante and colleagues reported that adults with language-based learning disabilities generalized grammatical patterns only when the input was highly variable, with many different words exemplifying the grammatical patterns.

A third Editor's Award came in 2017 for Plante's LSHSS article "Dose schedule and enhanced conversational recast treatment for children with specific language impairment," co-authored with Christina N. Meyers-Denman. This paper demonstrated benefits of conversational recasts in supporting children's learning of grammatical morphology, where the therapist adds or corrects grammatical elements (e.g., word endings) while repeating back what the child has just said.

== Representative Publications ==
- Plante, E. (1991). MRI findings in the parents and siblings of specifically language-impaired boys. Brain and Language, 41(1), 67–80.
- Plante, E. M. (1998). Criteria for SLI: The Stark and Tallal legacy and beyond. Journal of Speech, Language, and Hearing Research, 41(4), 951–957.
- Plante, E., & Gómez, R. L. (2018). Learning without trying: The clinical relevance of statistical learning. Language, Speech, and Hearing Services in Schools, 49(3S), 710–722.
- Plante, E. M., & Vance, R. (1991). MRI findings in boys with specific language impairment. Brain and Language, 41(1), 52–66.
- Plante, E., & Vance, R. (1994). Selection of preschool language tests. Language, Speech, and Hearing Services in Schools, 25(1), 15–24.
