= Corso =

Corso may refer to:

== Places ==
- Corso, Boumerdès, Algeria
- Via del Corso, Rome, Italy

== Other uses ==
- Corso (surname)
- CORSO, a New Zealand aid agency
- "CORSO," a song by rapper Tyler, the Creator

== See also ==
- Cane Corso, a breed of dog
