= Chris Dessi =

Christopher Dessi is an American writer.

== Early life and education ==
Dessi was born in Brooklyn, New York. He holds a bachelor's degree from Loyola University Maryland and a master's degree from New York University.

Dessi currently lives in Chappaqua, New York.

== Career ==
In 2010, Dessi founded Silverback Social, a company he led as CEO until its acquisition by PerformLine, Inc. in October 2017. Before founding Silverback Social, he worked at Buddy Media, which was later acquired by SalesForce.

In 2012, Dessi independently organized a marathon after the cancellation of the New York City Marathon due to Hurricane Sandy. He undertook this challenge to support his father, Adrian Dessi, who was battling Amyotrophic Lateral Sclerosis (ALS). Through social media, he raised over $3,000 for ALS research. The marathon, held at the Pleasantville High School track, was attended by family, friends, and local residents. He also competed in the marathon, completing a 26.2-mile run.

In 2013, Dessi started the Westchester Digital Summit, an annual event about digital media held at Westchester County Center in White Plains. In September 2015, Baltimore Digital Summit was launched.

In 2016, Dessi gave a TEDx talk titled "Vulnerability Works."

As an author, Dessi has written four books, Your World is Exploding, Remarkable You, Just Like You, and ChatGPT for Profit.

== Bibliography ==
- Your World is Exploding, Dessi, Chris (2012).
- Remarkable You, Dessi, Chris (2015).
- Just Like You, Dessi, Chris (2015).
