= Brian F. Linnane =

American Jesuit academic

Brian Francis Linnane

25th President of Loyola University Maryland
- In office July 1, 2005 – June 30, 2021
- Preceded by: Rev. Harold Ridley, S.J.
- Succeeded by: Amanda Thomas, PhD (interim)

Personal details
- Born: Brian Francis Linnane; August 25, 1955 (age 70)
- Education: Boston College (AB); Georgetown University (MA); Jesuit School of Theology at Berkeley (M.Div., STL); Yale University (MA, MPhil, Ph.D.)

Brian Francis Linnane, S.J. (born August 25, 1955) is an American Jesuit academic who served as president of Loyola University Maryland from 2005 to 2021. Before assuming the presidency, he served as an assistant dean and associate professor at College of the Holy Cross, a Jesuit institution in Worcester, Massachusetts.

== Early life and education ==
Born August 25, 1955, Fr. Linnane entered the Society of Jesus in 1977 and was ordained to the Roman Catholic priesthood on June 14, 1986. He earned an A.B. degree, magna cum laude, from Boston College in 1977 and an M.A. in government from Georgetown University in 1981 before undertaking divinity studies at the Jesuit School of Theology at Berkeley, where he received an M.Div. in 1986 and an S.T.L. in 1988. He earned an M.A. in 1990, an M.Phil. in 1991, and a Ph.D. in 1994 in religious studies from Yale University. He received an honorary doctorate from Loyola University Maryland in 2015.

== College of the Holy Cross ==
Fr. Linnane joined the Religious Studies department at Holy Cross in 1994. He has written several scholarly articles in the disciplines of fundamental moral theology, health care ethics, and virtue ethics. He served as assistant dean at Holy Cross from 2003 to 2005 and was named a Loyola College Trustee in 2000.

== Loyola University ==
In July 2005, Fr. Linnane became the 24th President of Loyola University Maryland. As president of Loyola University Maryland, Fr. Linnane has overseen the opening of the Ridley Athletic Complex as well as renovation and expansion of Donnelly Science Center, the building of Thea Bowman Hall, the expansion and renovation of Loyola/Notre Dame Library, the opening of the McClure Tennis Center, and the groundbreaking for the Miguel B. Fernandez Family Center for Innovation and Collaborative Learning, which opened in Fall 2021. He steered the university through the strategic plan, Grounded in Tradition, Educating for the Future and led Loyola through its designation change from Loyola College in Maryland to Loyola University Maryland in 2009. He launched and completed Loyola's first comprehensive fundraising campaign, Bright Minds, Bold Hearts, and he provided and inspired the vision for Messina, Loyola's distinctive living learning program.

Fr. Linnane currently serves on the board of trustees for Marquette University; University of Detroit Mercy; and the Institute of Christian and Jewish Studies. Fr. Linnane retired from the presidency at Loyola University Maryland on June 30, 2021. He has been named President Emeritus at Loyola.
