= Recast (language teaching) =

Method of language teaching

A recast is a technique used in language teaching to correct learners' errors in such a way that communication is not obstructed. To recast an error, an interlocutor will repeat the error back to the learner in a corrected form. Recasts are used both by teachers in formal educational settings, and by interlocutors in naturalistic language acquisition.

== Child language acquisition ==
Recasts can be used by adults to improve children's native language skills. A frequently used technique is for the adult to imitate the child's speech. In this form of recast, the adult repeats the child's incorrect phrases in correct form. This enables the child to learn the correct pronunciation, grammar and sentence structure.

== Language education ==
Recasts can be used for teaching second languages. Sometimes, the teacher will repeat the words back to the student, usually with different intonation or form, or as a question, so that the recasting appears as a continuation of the conversation:

For example, in German:

- Student: "Ich möchte haben ein Stift."
- Teacher: "Du möchtest einen Stift haben?"

Here, the teacher has corrected the student's incorrect positioning of the infinitive "haben" and their declension of the indefinite article "ein".

In this form the recast is usually more than a simple repeating of the learner's words. The teacher will correct the student's errors but also extend the learning by adding additional words or phrases.

A further example, in English:

- Student: "I want eat."
- Teacher: "What do you want to eat?"

In this example the teacher is making the correction to the student's speech (adding a "to") but also extending the learning by asking a question.

== Efficacy ==
Some researchers into second language learning have challenged the degree of effectiveness of recasts drawing attention to the abilities of the learner and the limitations imposed by the learner only being able to repeat the words of the teacher as factors that have not been accounted for by proponents of the method.

== See also ==
- Rod Ellis
- Elena Plante
