= Brennan Morris =

American swimmer (born 1990)

Personal information
- Born: November 2, 1990 (age 35) Albany, New York, U.S.
- Height: 5 ft 11 in (180 cm)
- Weight: 185 lb (84 kg)

Sport
- Sport: Swimming
- Strokes: Freestyle, medley
- Club: North Baltimore Aquatic Club

Brennan Morris (born November 2, 1990, in Albany, New York) is an American swimmer.

== Career ==
At the 2009 US National Championships and World Championship Trials, Morris placed second in the 1500 m freestyle with a time of 15:13.47, earning a place to compete at the 2009 World Aquatics Championships in Rome. Morris placed 15th at the World Championships with a time of 15:16.47.

He holds Metro Atlantic Athletic Conference records in the 500, 1000, and 1650 yard freestyles and the 400 yard IM. Morris was named MAAC Most Outstanding Swimmer for the third consecutive year in 2012.

== Personal life ==
Morris trains at the North Baltimore Aquatic Club with coach Bob Bowman and Michael Phelps. He attended Loyola University Maryland, where as a freshman he became the first Greyhound swimmer to achieve an NCAA 'B' qualifying time.

== Personal bests (long course) ==
Event	Time	Date
1500 m freestyle	15:13.47	July 2009
