= Humanities Center (Loyola University Maryland) =

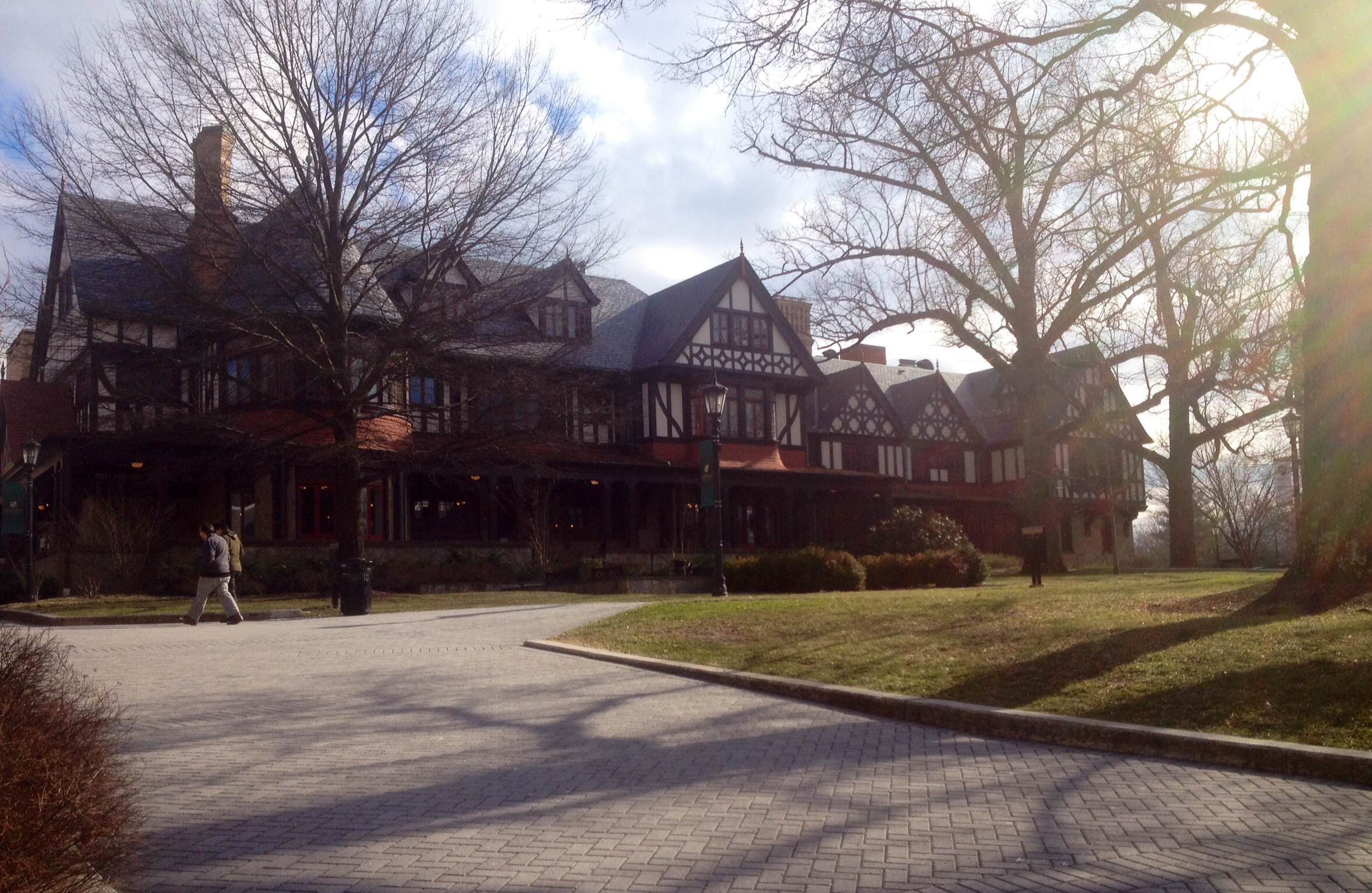
- The Humanities Center on Loyola's Evergreen Campus
- Interactive map of the Humanities Center area

General information
- Type: Academic
- Architectural style: Tudor Revival
- Location: Baltimore, Maryland, USA
- Coordinates: 39°20′46.5″N 76°37′9″W
- Completed: 1896
- Cost: $85,000
- Owner: Loyola University Maryland

Design and construction
- Architect: Renwick, Aspinwall & Renwick

Website
- loyola.edu

The Francis Xavier Knott, S.J. Knott Humanities Center, commonly known as the Humanities Center, is the oldest building on the campus of Loyola University Maryland in Baltimore, Maryland. The Tudor Revival building was originally built as a private residence in 1896 by New York architecture firm Renwick, Aspinwall & Renwick.

Alice Whitridge Garret, the widowed heiress to the Baltimore and Ohio Railroad fortune, had the house built on the southern edge of the Garret Family’s Evergreen estate in Baltimore. It was to be a wedding present for her son Horatio and his bride Charlotte Garrett and serve as their “cottage” home. The house was nicknamed “Evergreen junior” and cost $85,000 to build. However, Horatio would die of cancer while traveling in Europe in 1896 and never see the house completed. It sat unoccupied until 1919, when the Garret Family lent the house to the Red Cross as an institution for blinded servicemen in World War I.

In 1921, the Jesuits from Loyola College purchased the house and 20 surrounding acres from the Garret Family to relocate their campus from Calvert Street. The college initially used the house for academic space, but in 1924 converted it into the Jesuit priest’s residence and renamed the house Jesuit House. The house was expanded in 1939, but was severely damaged by a fire in 1955. The building was rebuilt and significantly expanded from 1956 to 1958. In 1992, Loyola undertook a $6 million renovation to Jesuit House to consolidate 16 academic departments into a newly converted Humanities Center. The Jesuit priests were relocated to a smaller residence across Millbrook Rd called Millbrook House, now known as Ignatius House. The renovation included a 30,000 square foot addition to the rear of the former Jesuit House. The college hired architecture firm Frank Gant Architects to oversee the renovation. In 2011, the popular Netflix drama series House of Cards filmed scenes inside the Humanities Center.

Today the Humanities Center serves a number of departments and offices, houses the office of the president, the admissions office and includes a popular dining area known as the refectory.
