= Joseph A. Sellinger =

American Jesuit educator

23rd President of Loyola College in Maryland
- In office 1964–1993
- Preceded by: Vincent Beatty, S.J.
- Succeeded by: Harold Ridley, S.J.

Dean of Georgetown College
- In office 1957–1964
- Preceded by: Brian A. McGrath, S.J.
- Succeeded by: Thomas R. Fitzgerald, S.J.

Personal details
- Born: January 17, 1921 Philadelphia, Pennsylvania, U.S.
- Died: April 19, 1993 (aged 72) Baltimore, Maryland, U.S.
- Education: St. Joseph's Prep; Spring Hill College

Joseph A. Sellinger, S.J. (January 17, 1921 – April 19, 1993) was an American Catholic priest and Jesuit. He served as the President of Loyola College in Maryland from 1964 to 1993, making him the longest-serving president of any Jesuit university in the United States at the time. During his presidency, he oversaw a significant transformation and growth of the school, including its merger with Mount Saint Agnes College, the admission of female students, the creation of an independent School of Business and Management (which was later named in his honor), and substantial increases in the school's endowment, number of professors, and campus. Prior to his appointment as president, he was a professor of theology at Georgetown University in Washington, D.C., and served as the Dean of Georgetown College from 1957 to 1964.

== Early life ==
Joseph Sellinger was born on January 17, 1921, in Philadelphia, Pennsylvania, to Frank and Carolyn Sellinger. He was the younger brother of Frank Sellinger, an executive who worked with the Burger Brewing Company and Anheuser-Busch but was most noted for being vice chairman and chief executive officer of the Joseph Schlitz Brewing Company from 1978 until his retirement in 1983. He attended St. Joseph's Preparatory School, where he graduated first in his class, before entering the Society of Jesus in 1938. He was then sent to the seminary in Wernersville, Pennsylvania, and then Spring Hill College in Alabama in 1942. He began teaching chemistry, philosophy, logic, and German at Loyola College in Maryland at the age of 24. In 1951, he was ordained a priest at the Facultes St. Albert de Louvain in Belgium. Following his ordination, he was made a professor of theology at Georgetown University in Washington, D.C. He became the Dean of Georgetown College at Georgetown University in 1957, and remained in the position until 1964. Sellinger was expected to become the next President of Georgetown University, but had a falling-out with the Jesuit hierarchy, and was sent to Loyola.

== Loyola College ==
Sellinger was appointed president of Loyola College in Maryland in 1964. He oversaw significant changes in the school as a result of the turmoil of the 1960s as well as the reforms of the Second Vatican Council. Among these was the conversion of the college from all-male to co-educational (despite his initial opposition), which occurred after the absorption of Mount Saint Agnes College in 1971. Over the course of his almost 30-year presidency, the school transitioned from a small commuter school to a regional college. He acquired the school's first dormitory in 1967, Hammerman House, and established the School of Business and Management as its own institution in 1983. A successful fundraiser, he created the school's endowment, which totaled $42 million at the time of his death. Likewise, the school's operating budget increased from $1.4 million in 1964 to $65 million in 1993; the number of professors increased from 100 to 400 in the same time. The campus also grew from 35 acres (14 hectares) to 60 acres (24 hectares).

He died on April 19, 1993, of pancreatic cancer in the President's House on Loyola College's campus, and his funeral was held in the Cathedral of Mary Our Queen. He is interred at the Jesuit Novitiate of St. Isaac Jogues in Wernersville. His presidency was the longest of any among the Jesuit universities in the United States.

== Legacy ==
Sellinger Lounge in the Leavey Center at Georgetown is named in his honor. Governor William Donald Schaefer announced in 1993 that the state of Maryland's program for distributing money to private colleges would be named after him. This fund was challenged before the United States Supreme Court on First Amendment grounds, and Sellinger partook in the program's defense along with other private colleges; the constitutionality of the fund was upheld in 1976, in the case of Romer v. Board of Public Works. In 1984, Loyola College's business school was renamed the Rev. Joseph A. Sellinger, S.J. School of Business and Management in honor of him, after an anonymous donor pledged $1 million to the school contingent upon its renaming.

Academic offices
Preceded by Vincent Beatty, S.J.	23rd President of Loyola College in Maryland; 1964–1993	Succeeded by Harold Ridley, S.J.
Preceded by Brian A. McGrath, S.J.	Dean of Georgetown College; 1957–1964	Succeeded by Thomas R. Fitzgerald, S.J.
