= Gaspare dell'Acqua =

Italian painter of the Renaissance period

Gaspare dell'Acqua (active circa 1460) was an Italian painter of the Renaissance period, active mainly in Genoa and Pavia.

He was born in Lodi, Lombardy, and is known to have been in Genoa working with Niccolò Corso of Corsica.
