= Jason J. Corso =

Jason Joseph Corso is Co-Founder / CEO of the computer vision startup Voxel51 and a Professor of Robotics, Electrical Engineering and Computer Science at the University of Michigan.

== Education ==
Corso received his PhD and MSE degrees in Computer Science at Johns Hopkins University in 2005 and 2002, respectively, and the BS Degree with honors from Loyola College, Maryland, in 2000. He spent two years as a post-doctoral fellow at the University of California, Los Angeles.

== Career ==
From 2007 to 2014, Corso was a member of the Computer Science and Engineering faculty at SUNY-Buffalo. Afterwards, he joined the Department of Electrical Engineering and Computer Science at the University of Michigan, where he is still a faculty member. In 2022, he became a founding faculty member of the new Department of Robotics at the University of Michigan. He is jointly appointed in Robotics and EECS. He is the recipient of a University of Michigan EECS Outstanding Achievement Award 2018, Google Faculty Research Award 2015, the Army Research Office Young Investigator Award 2010, NSF CAREER award 2009, SUNY Buffalo Young Investigator Award 2011, a member of the 2009 DARPA Computer Science Study Group, and a recipient of the Link Foundation Fellowship in Advanced Simulation and Training 2003. He is a member of the AAAI, ACM, MAA and a senior member of the IEEE. In 2016, Corso co-founded a computer vision startup in Ann Arbor called Voxel51.

=== Research ===
Corso focuses on cognitive computer vision and its entanglement with language, physical constraints, robotics, autonomy, and the semantics of the natural world, both in corner-cases and at scale. He primarily focuses on problems in video understanding such as video segmentation, activity recognition, and video-to-text.

== Awards ==
- Toyota Professor of Artificial Intelligence 2026
- EECS Outstanding Achievement Award 2018 from University of Michigan, Department of Electrical Engineering and Computer Science
- Best Associate Editor Award for ICRA 2016
- Google Faculty Research Award 2015
- SUNY at Buffalo Young Investigator Award 2011
- Army Research Office Young Investigator Award 2010
- National Science Foundation CAREER Award 2009

== Publications ==
- Action Bank: A high-level representation of activity in video. Sreemanananth Sadanand, Jason J Corso. Computer Vision and Pattern Recognition (CVPR), 2012 IEEE. Pages 1234–1241.
- Efficient multilevel brain tumor segmentation with integrated bayesian model classification. Jason J Corso, Eitan Sharon, Shishir Dube, Suzie El-Saden, Usha Sinha, Alan Yuille. 2008/5. Journal Medical Imaging, IEEE. Volume 27 Issue 5. Pages 629–640.
- Streaming hierarchical video segmentation. Chenliang Xu, Caiming Xiong, Jason J. Corso. European Conference on Computer Vision (ECCV), 2012. Pages 626–639.
- Evaluation of super-voxel methods for early video processing. Chenliang Xu, Jason J. Corso. Computer Vision and Pattern Recognition (CVPR), 2012 IEEE. Pages 1202–1209.
- A thousand frames in just a few words: Lingual description of videos through latent topics and sparse object stitching. Pradipto Das, Chenliang Xu, Richard F. Doell, Jason J. Corso. Computer Vision and Pattern Recognition (CVPR), 2013 IEEE. Pages 2634–2641.
- Weakly supervised actor-action segmentation via robust multi-task ranking. Y. Yan, C. Xu, D. Cai, and J. J. Corso. In Proceedings of IEEE Conference on Computer Vision and Pattern Recognition, 2017.
- Click-here: Human-localized keypoints as guidance for viewpoint estimation. R. Szeto and J. J. Corso. In Proceedings of IEEE International Conference on Computer Vision, 2017.
- Towards automatic learning of procedures from web instructional videos. L. Zhou, C. Xu, and J. J. Corso. In Proceedings of AAAI Conference on Artificial Intelligence, 2018.
- BubbleNets: Learning to select the guidance frame in video object segmentation by deep sorting frames. B. Griffin and J. J. Corso. In Proceedings of IEEE Conference on Computer Vision and Pattern Recognition, 2019.
- Grounded video description. L. Zhou, Y. Kalantidis, X. Chen, J. J. Corso, and M. Rohrbach. In Proceedings of IEEE Conference on Computer Vision and Pattern Recognition, 2019.
