= Niccolò Corso =

Italian painter

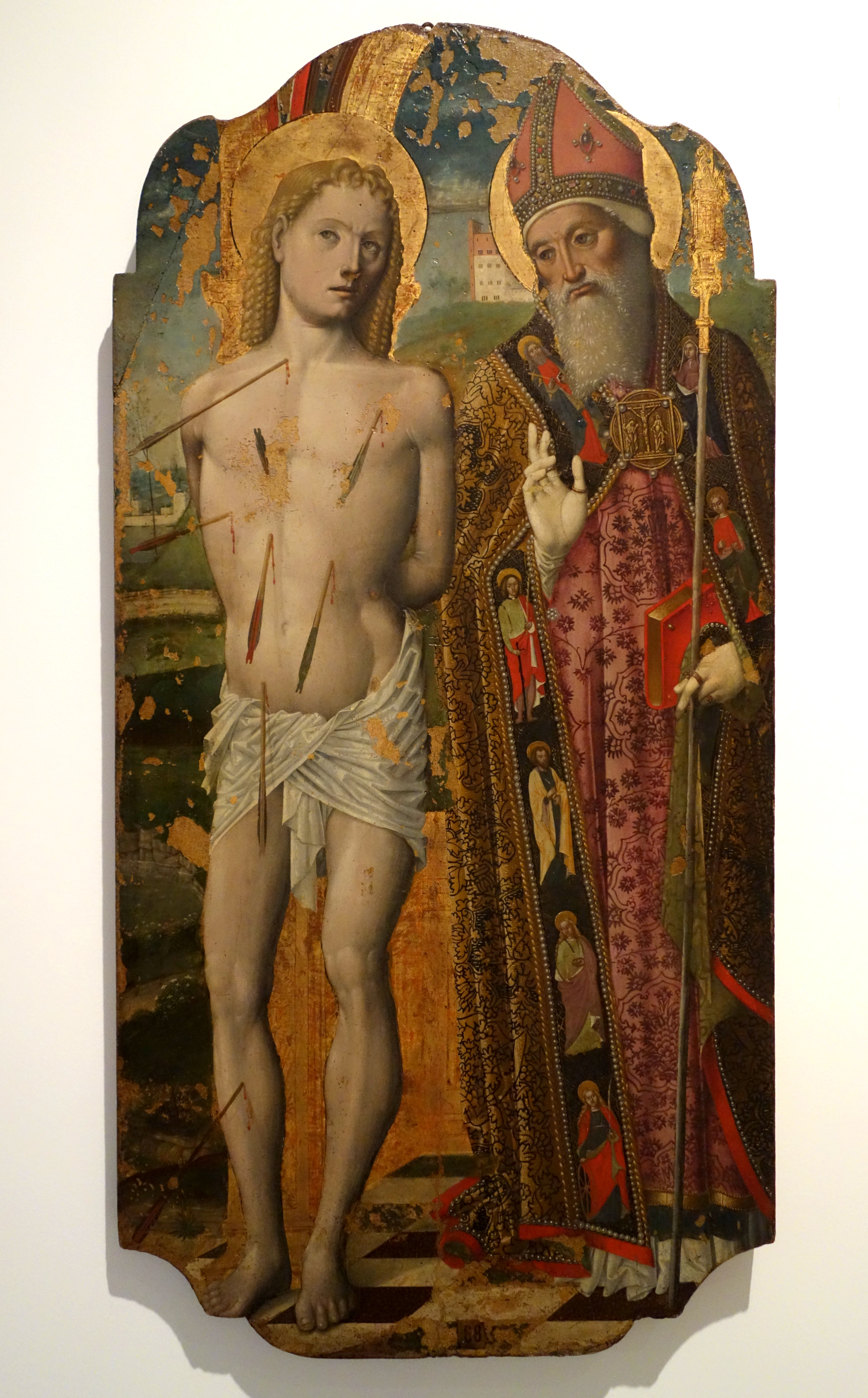
Sts Sebastian and Augustine (?) (1490), Accademia Ligustica, Genoa

Niccolò Corso, also known as Niccolò di Lombarduccio (1446 – circa 1512), was an Italian painter of the Renaissance period, active mainly in Liguria. The majority of his known pictures are located in the cloister and refectory of the monastery of the Olivetan Fathers at Quarto, near Genoa.

== Life ==
He was the son of a certain Lombarduccio, a native of Corsica and was probably born in Liguria around 1446. His family name Corso is a reference to his Corsican roots.

The first documentary evidence on the artists dates to 15 September 1469 when a 'Nicola de Corsus Plebs Vici Corsice q. Lombarducii' enters in Genoa into a partnership with the painter and jewel-case maker Gaspare dell’Acqua from Pavia. The two artists collaborated on the decoration of cassone panels Only a few weeks later the two artists decided to dissolve the partnership.

Nothing is known about his training or whether he worked initially in Corsica. It appears he was exposed to the Flemish painting of Jan van Eyck and Rogier van der Weyden as well as Provençal painting. The artist's style emerges confidently in the Madonna with Child and Angels (Bonnefantenmuseum, Maastricht), which dates to the period 1465-70 and was made for the parish of La Turbie (Nice). This work quotes verbatim the Madonna of the anonymous Master of the Madonna Cagnola, to whose work Corso's early production is closely related. His early panels also show his knowledge of the painting of Vincenzo Foppa at the beginning of the 1460s.

He worked for many years at the Olivetan monastery of St Jerome located in Quarto, near Genoa. He worked there for the first time in 1489 and then continuously from 1491 to 1494. The works he made there include frescoes on the life of St. Benedict. In 1491 he worked with Francesco de' Ferrari of Pavia on an Annunciazion with Saints for the church of Santa Maria della Passione in Genoa. Corso also collaborated with Davide da Staglieno on frescoes for the Chapel of Pope Sixtus IV in the Franciscan convent of Savona.
