= Nancy Helm-Estabrooks =

Speech-language pathologist

- Born: Nancy Helm

Academic background
- Education: Boston University
- Thesis: The gestural behavior of aphasic patients during confrontation naming (1980)

Nancy Helm-Estabrooks is an emeritus professor at Western Carolina University where she was the first Brewer Smith Distinguished Professor. She is known for her work on persons with aphasia and acquired cognitive-communication disorders.

== Education and career ==
Helm-Estabrooks received her Bachelor of Arts degree in Speech and Hearing Therapy at the University of Massachusetts Amherst, a Master of Education in Speech-Language Pathology at Northeastern University, and her Doctor of Science degree at Boston University.

Helms-Estabrooks has worked at the Harold Goodglass Aphasia Research Center and Boston University School of Medicine, the University of North Carolina at Chapel Hill, and the University of Arizona. As of 2022, she is a professor emerita and the former Brewer-Smith Distinguished Chair in the Department of Communication Disorders and Sciences at Western Carolina University.

Helms-Estabrooks was a co-founder of Academy of Neurologic Communication Disorders and Sciences (ANCDS), and served as president from 2003 until 2004.

== Academic work ==
Helm-Estabrooks is a researcher and speech-language pathologist (SLP) specializing in the design and application of widely used diagnostic. She developed, in collaboration with behavioral neurologist Martin Albert and Robert Sparks, a structured rehabilitation program for a type of nonfluent aphasia utilizing intoned phrases to facilitate speech and language production. This program became known as Melodic Intonation Therapy. She subsequently designed and published programs and materials for treating aphasia symptoms and cognitive impairments.

== Awards and honors ==
Helm-Estabrooks received Honors of the American Speech Language Hearing Association (ASHA) in 2000, and is a 2004 fellow of ASHA. In 2005 she received Honors of the Academy of Neurologic Communication Disorders and Sciences. She received the Frank R. Kleffner Lifetime Clinical Career Award from the American Speech Language Hearing Foundation in 2012, and the Edith F. Kaplan Award from the Massachusetts Neuropsychological Society.

== Selected publications ==
- Helm-Estabrooks, Nancy (2002-03-01). "Cognition and aphasia: a discussion and a study". Journal of Communication Disorders. 35 (2): 171–186. doi:10.1016/S0021-9924(02)00063-1. ISSN 0021-9924. PMID 12036150.
- Helm-Estabrooks, Nancy; Fitzpatrick, Patricia M.; Barresi, Barbara (1982-11-01). "Visual Action Therapy for Global Aphasia". Journal of Speech and Hearing Disorders. 47 (4): 385–389. doi:10.1044/jshd.4704.385. PMID 6194372.
- Naeser, M A; Alexander, M P; Helm-Estabrooks, N; Levine, H L; Laughlin, S A; Geschwind, N (1982-01-01). "Aphasia with predominantly subcortical lesion sites: description of three capsular/putaminal aphasia syndromes". Archives of Neurology. 39 (1): 2–14. doi:10.1001/archneur.1982.00510130004002. ISSN 1538-3687. PMID 6976780.
- Helm-Estabrooks, Nancy (2014). Manual of aphasia and aphasia therapy. Martin L. Albert, Marjorie Nicholas (3rd ed.). Austin, Texas: PRO-ED, an international publisher. ISBN 978-1-4164-0549-8. OCLC 813301115.
