= Mount Saint Agnes College =

Catholic women's college in Baltimore, Maryland US

Coordinates: 39°22′12″N 76°39′18″W

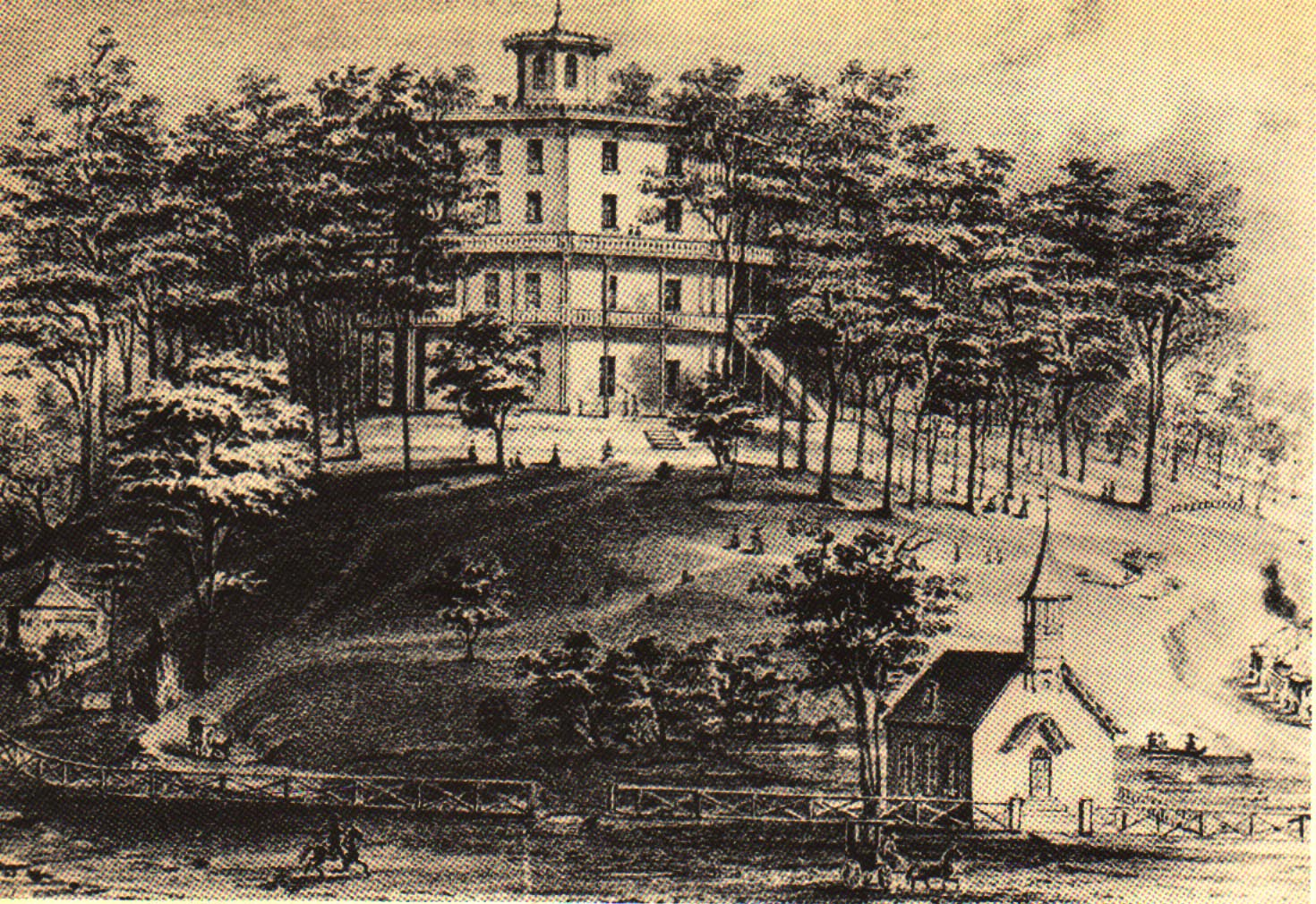
Sketch of The Octagon on Mount Saint Agnes College Campus

Mount Saint Agnes College was a Catholic women's college located in the Mount Washington neighborhood of Baltimore, Maryland. It opened in 1890 and was operated by the Sisters of Mercy. In 1971, Mount Saint Agnes merged with nearby Loyola College in Maryland (today Loyola University Maryland), which still oversees the Mount Saint Agnes Alumnae Association. The college closed as its own degree-granting institution in 1972.

In 1853 the original land was bought by Elias Heiner and George Gelbach, Jr. to build Mount Washington Female College. Mount Washington Female College, affiliated with the Lutheran Church, was chartered in 1856, but, the College closed during the Civil War and after the war the land was bought and sold numerous times. Eventually, the property was sold to Charles Dougherty, who purchased the land for the Sisters of Mercy in 1867. The Sisters bought it from Dougherty in 1870.

As Dougherty had bought the land and later sold it to the Sisters of Mercy, "the Sisters changed the name to Mount Saint Agnes, the name of his wife."

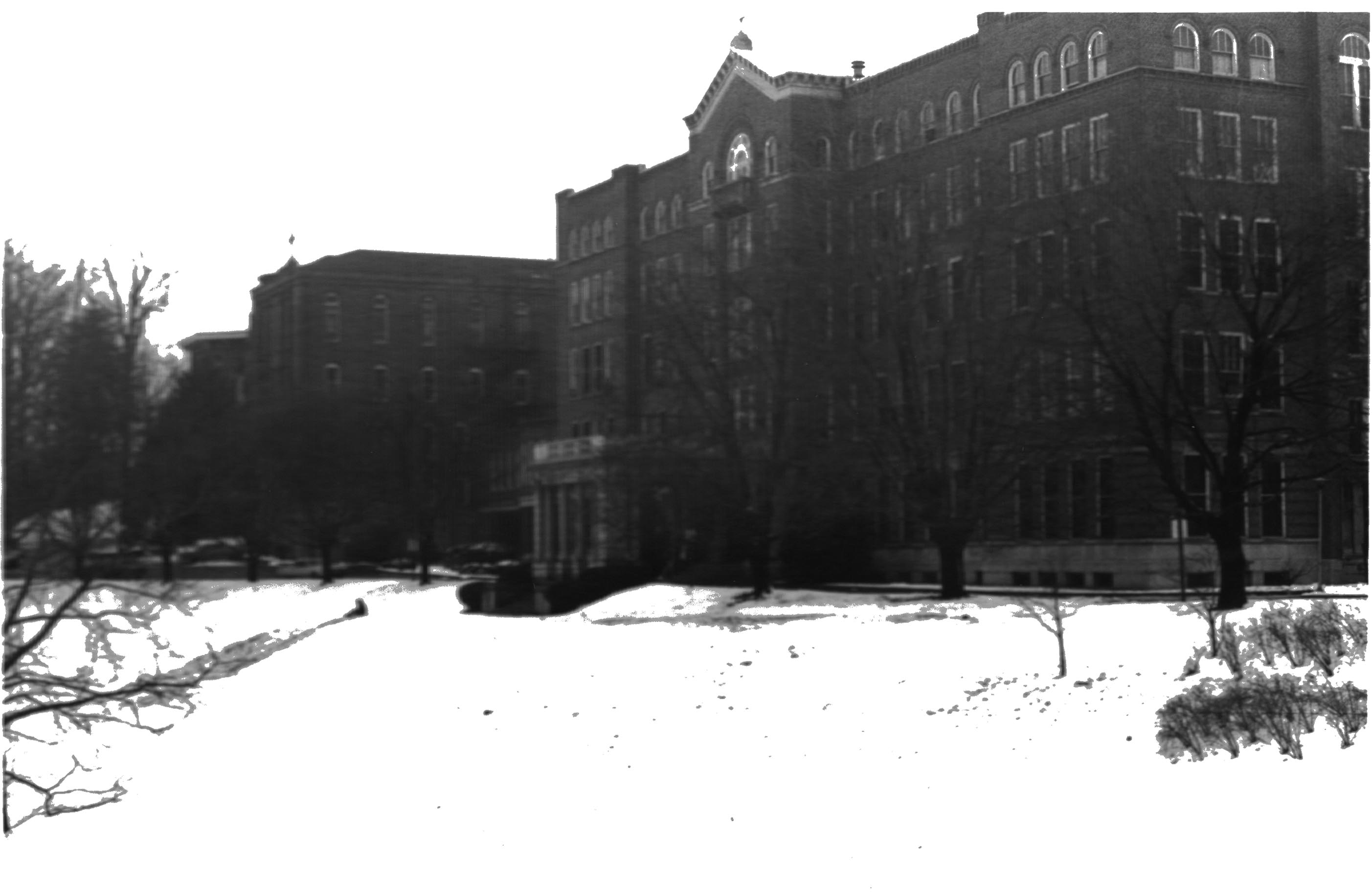
McAuley Hall

Over the next few decades, the former Mount Saint Agnes campus was owned and used by United States Fidelity & Guaranty Company and the St. Paul Companies. In 2003, it was purchased by the Johns Hopkins University and is now called the Mount Washington campus of the Johns Hopkins University.

== The Octagon and the Campus ==
The Octagon was one of the most iconic buildings of the Mount Saint Agnes Campus. It was constructed as part of Mount Washington Female College, and underwent several iterations of renovation and restoration as successive institutions owned the campus.

It served as primary building for Mount Saint Agnes. As the college grew, Atkinson Hall was built in 1925 to support more students.

In cooperation with the Alumnae Association, Loyola College offers two scholarships each year to descendants and relatives of Mount Saint Agnes alumnae, one for an incoming first-year student and one for a graduate student.

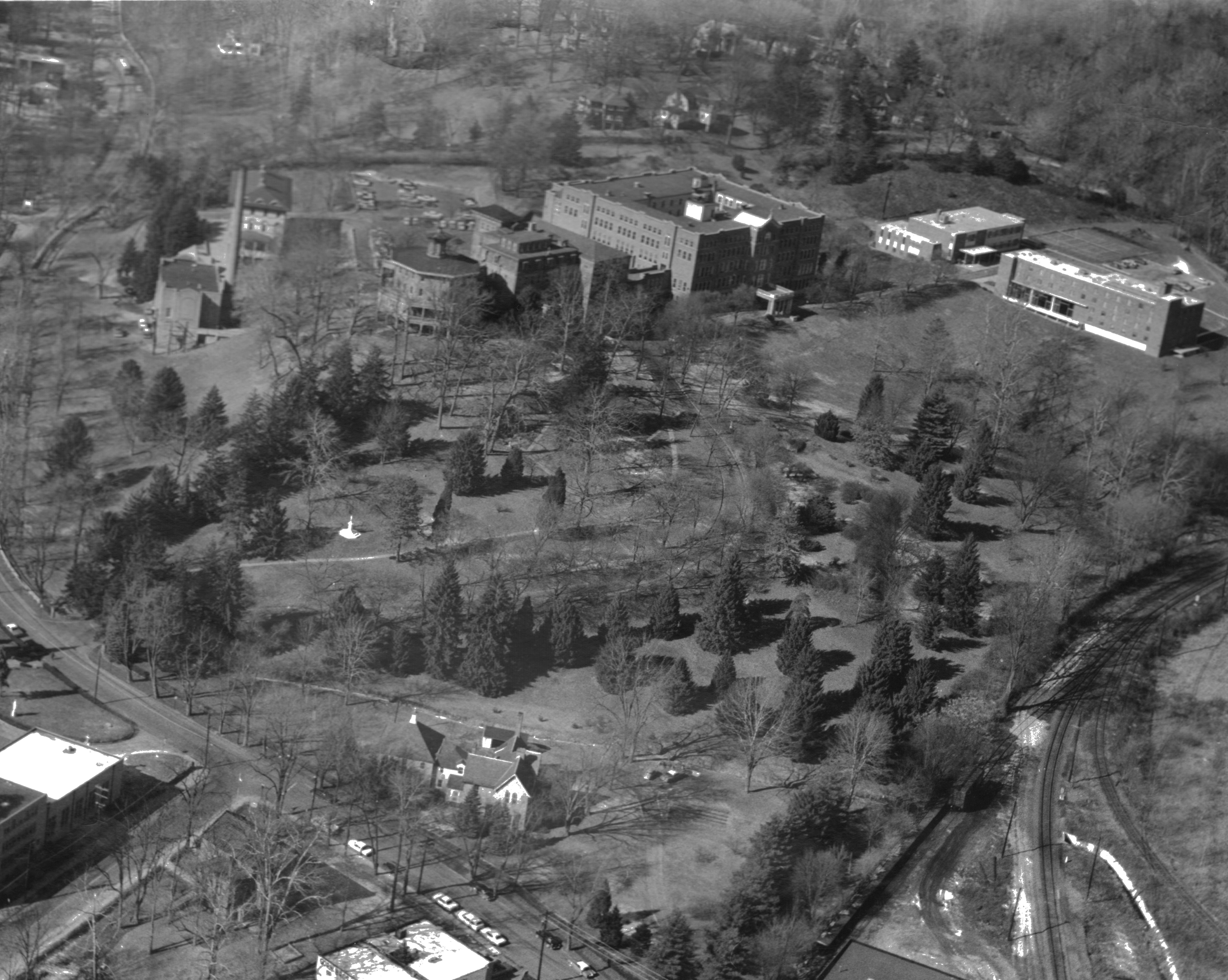
Aerial view of Mount Saint Agnes campus

The college's name lives on in the form of the Mount Saint Agnes Theological Center for Women, which operates from the former Provincial House on the campus.

== Alumnae Association ==
On June 18, 1899, Alumnae of Mount Saint Agnes organized the first meeting of the Mount Saint Agnes College Alumnae Association and Mrs. Charles Burke became the 1st president. The alumnae association was running smoothly until World War I when the college closed due to lack of attendance. The association changed after the war. "All alumnae joining after 1918 were necessarily our high school graduates even though they may have attained degrees elsewhere."

The alumnae association split into the High School Alumnae and College Alumnae around 1955. Today the Mount Saint Agnes College Alumnae Association works closely with the Loyola Office of Alumni Relations in order to plan events and promote lectures.

The most noted alumna of Mount Saint Agnes is United States Senator Barbara Mikulski (D-MD). Mathematician Harry Bateman was a Mount Saint Agnes faculty member while he was at Johns Hopkins University.

== Merger with Loyola College ==
MSA started a student exchange program with Loyola College in the early 1960s. The program was successful but only lasted a few years. "By the late sixties, Sister Mary Cleophas and Father Joseph A. Sellinger realized that the three-way merger they had envisioned – as the Catholic College of Baltimore – (the third member of which would have been the College of Notre Dame of Maryland [NDM]) was not going to come to fruition." This was because "the NDM faculty was composed of all SSNDs (School Sisters of Notre Dame) and the college had not yet felt the financial exigency that Loyola and Mount Saint Agnes had, both of which had already a very significant number of lay faculty."

It was “announced during the Fall of 1970, the final pre-merger year.”

== See also ==
- List of current and historical women's universities and colleges
