= Sellinger School of Business and Management =

Business school of Loyola University Maryland

Coordinates: 39°20′47″N 76°37′28″W

The Joseph A. Sellinger, S.J. School of Business and Management
- Type: Private, Jesuit
- Established: 1980
- Endowment: 16 million
- Dean: Mary Ann Scully
- Academic staff: 62 full-time, 50 part-time
- Students: 938 full-time undergraduates, 1006 part-time graduate students
- Location: Baltimore, Maryland, USA
- Campus: Urban
- Website: www.loyola.edu/sellinger

The Joseph A. Sellinger, S.J. School of Business and Management is the business school of Loyola University Maryland (formerly Loyola College in Maryland) and is located on the college's main campus in Baltimore, Maryland. Formally established in 1980, the business school was named in honor of Loyola's late president Reverend Joseph A. Sellinger, S.J., although the university has been offering courses in business for over 70 years. The Sellinger School consists of seven academic departments: Accounting, Economics, Finance, Information Systems/ Operations Management, Management/International Business, Marketing, and Law & Social Responsibility. The Sellinger School of Business and Management is one of Loyola's three schools, the other two being the College of Arts and Sciences and the College of Education.

== History ==
Loyola College first offered accounting and business administration courses at the undergraduate level in 1937. The baccalaureate degree in business administration was first awarded in 1943, with the accounting major added shortly thereafter. Loyola introduced the Executive MBA program in 1973, the first of its kind in the Baltimore-Washington area and one of the first ten Executive MBA programs.

Loyola established the School of Business and Management in 1980 to provide strategic management for business programs. In 1984, the business school was formally named The Joseph A. Sellinger, S.J. School of Business and Management in honor of the late Reverend Joseph A. Sellinger. In 1985, the Sellinger School initiated the Fellows MBA program to serve rising young executives. In 1988, the Sellinger School earned accreditation in all programs by AACSB (The International Association for Management Education). In early 2000, the Sellinger School moved into a new state-of-the-art facility constructed on the north side of the academic quadrangle.

In July 2021, then dean Kathleen Getz left to become president of Mercyhurst University. In the same month, accounting professor and associate dean for academics, Bobby Waldrup, was appointed interim dean of the Sellinger School. Waldrup's tenure as dean lasted until July 2022, when former CEO of Howard Bank Mary Ann Scully took over the role. As of May 2023, Scully is dean of the school.

== Jesuit Education ==
View from the bridge.

Loyola University Maryland is a Jesuit Catholic university committed to the educational and spiritual traditions of the Society of Jesus and to the ideals of liberal education and the development of the whole person. Accordingly, the College will inspire students to learn, lead and serve in a diverse and changing world.

All undergraduates complete the core curriculum that includes courses in English, philosophy, theology, ethics, history, fine arts, foreign language, mathematics, science, and social sciences. The College sponsors a variety of programs and opportunities in support of its Jesuit mission; these include the Center for Values and Service, Campus Ministry, and Catholic Studies.

== Academics ==
Students are offered the chance for enriched academic discussion and a broadened learning environment through Internship, Study Abroad, and Service-Learning Experiences. Two of the three are required for graduation from the Sellinger School.

The college recognizes chapters of Beta Gamma Sigma and Beta Alpha Psi, and affords students international societies such as the Financial Management Association for academic growth and development. The Sellinger Scholars business honors program was developed to prepare highly motivated students for roles of leadership and service in a diverse and changing world. Students are invited to join in their Freshmen year based on academic achievement and must then go through an interview process.

== Rankings ==
- U.S. News & World Report ranked the Sellinger School of Business and Management 124 in Best Business Schools, and the part-time MBA program was ranked 87 for 2024.
- The Princeton Review listed Sellinger on their Best Business Schools list for 2023.
- The Health Finance Report ranked Loyola’s Executive MBA program as one of the top five programs for physicians.
- AACSB Accredited in both Business and Accounting – fewer than 10% of schools nationwide hold dual accreditation through AACSB.

== Facility ==
The Joseph A. Sellinger, S.J., School of Business and Management Building opened its doors in January 2000. The 50,000-square-foot (4,600 m²) facility features innovative learning space and faculty offices; a five-story glass façade; an open atrium; 11 state-of-the-art classrooms; a four-story glass tower; and three seminar rooms. The building resides on the northwest side of the academic quadrangle, neighboring Maryland Hall.

== Notable alumni ==
- Harry Markopolos, chief investment officer of Rampart Investment Management Co. and early whistleblower of Bernard Madoff
