= Arturo Dell'Acqua Bellavitis =

Arturo Dell'Acqua Bellavitis

Arturo Dell'Acqua Bellavitis (born 1947) is the current director of the Milan Triennale Foundation and Exposition and Provost of the Italian Institute of Fashion Management.

== Professional career ==
Apart from being the director of the Triennale, Bellavitis has his own architectural and design practice in Milan. Among other customers, he has worked for Twinings, Nestlé, Renault and HGV.

== Academic career ==
Bellavitis has been a lecturer, and is now full professor of Industrial design, Interior design, Textile design and Fashion design at Polytechnic University of Milan in Milan, Italy. At the same university, he is also the director of the Polidesign project, chairman of the Fashion Design department, and since 1990 he has been the director of the master's degree in Design Management and Interior Design.

He has been visiting professor at many European and extra-European universities. He has lectured at the Royal Academy of Copenhagen (Denmark), at the Faculty of Architecture of Aarhus (Denmark), at De Montfort University (UK). He has conducted workshops at the Universities of Helsinki (Finland), Oslo (Norway), Orléans (France), Barcelona (Spain), Montreal (Canada), São Paulo (Brazil).

He has held Interior & Lighting seminars in Rio de Janeiro, São Paulo and Barcelona.

He has taught Design Strategies and Technology and Prototypes workshops for the Design and Fashion Management courses at Bocconi Business School in Milan.

He has also supervised the Italian international exchange students project (Erasmus Programme) for the Industrial and Interior Design departments at Politecnico di Milano.

== Publications ==
Dell'Acqua Bellavitis has published many books and written various articles on international magazines such as Interni and Bagno Design.

Among others, he has co-written with other famous Italian architects, such as Andrea Branzi, Pierfrancesco Cravel, Fabio Novembre.

== Books ==
- Dell'Acqua Bellavitis, Pierfrancesco Cravel, Orsola Branzi "Propinare" Edizioni Cervino 1996
- Dell'Acqua Bellavitis, Arturo and Annicchiarico, Silvana: "Custom Built: The Concept of Unique in Italian Design", Brossura, Milan, 2003
- Dell'Acqua Bellavitis, Arturo and Branzi, Andrea: "Ipotesi tardocontemporanee. Spazi tra agonia e mutazione", Franco Angeli Editore, Milan, 1998
- Dell'Acqua Bellavitis, Arturo and Annicchiarico, Silvana: "Fuori serie. Pezzi unici, prototipi e prodotti su commissione nell'archeologia del design italiano", Brossura, Milan, 2003
- Dell'Acqua Bellavitis, Arturo; Ferré, Giusi and Sammicheli, Marco: "Moda e design: il progetto dell'eccellenza", Franco Angeli Editore, Milan, 2006
