= Loyola University Maryland =

Jesuit university in Baltimore, Maryland, US

- Former name: Loyola College in Maryland (1852–2009)
- Type: Private university
- Established: 1852; 174 years ago
- Founder: John Early
- Religious affiliation: Catholic Church (Jesuit)
- Academic affiliations: AJCU ACCU; NAICU CIC
- Endowment: $323.9 million (2024)
- President: Terrence M. Sawyer
- Students: 4,897 (fall 2024)
- Undergraduates: 3,881 (fall 2024)
- Postgraduates: 1,016 (fall 2024)
- Location: Baltimore, Maryland, United States; 39°20′46″N 76°37′08″W
- Campus: Suburban - 99 acres (40.1 ha)
- Colors: Green and grey
- Nickname: Greyhounds
- Sporting affiliations: NCAA Division I – Patriot League
- Website: www.loyola.edu

Loyola University Maryland is a private Jesuit university in Baltimore, Maryland. Established as Loyola College in Maryland by John Early and eight other members of the Society of Jesus in 1852, it is the ninth-oldest Jesuit college in the United States and the first college in the United States to bear the name of St. Ignatius of Loyola, the founder of the Society of Jesus.

Loyola's main campus is in Baltimore and features Collegiate Gothic architecture and a pedestrian bridge across Charles Street. The university is academically divided into three schools: the Loyola College of Arts and Sciences, the Loyola School of Education, and the Sellinger School of Business and Management. It currently operates a Clinical Center at Belvedere Square in Baltimore. Loyola previously had graduate centers in Timonium (closed May 2024) and Columbia, Maryland (closed August 2023).

The student body comprises approximately 4,000 undergraduate and 1,900 graduate students, representing 39 states and 44 countries, and 84% of undergraduates reside on campus. The average class size is 20, with a student-to-faculty ratio of 12:1. Approximately 73% of the student body receives some form of financial aid. Campus groups include the Association of Latin American & Spanish students (ALAS) and the Greyhound college newspaper. There is also the student-run, online-only publication, The Rival.

Notable alumni include Tom Clancy, author of many notable books such as The Hunt for Red October, and Mark Bowden, author of Black Hawk Down. Loyola's sports teams are nicknamed the Greyhounds and are best known for the perennially ranked men's and women's lacrosse teams. The men's lacrosse team's biggest rival is nearby Johns Hopkins University. The annual lacrosse games played between these two institutions is known as the "Battle of Charles Street". The school colors are green and grey.

== History ==
=== Founding ===
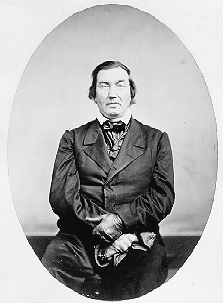
John Early, founder of Loyola

Loyola College in Maryland was founded in 1852 by John Early and eight other members of the Society of Jesus ("Jesuits"), and was the first college in the United States to bear the name of St. Ignatius of Loyola. Loyola College in Maryland is the ninth-oldest among the nation's 27 Jesuit colleges and universities.

The college's first campus was in two large townhouses on Holliday Street between East Lexington Street (then called Orange Alley) and East Fayette Street, in downtown Baltimore. After only three years, in 1855, Loyola relocated to a newly built structure on North Calvert Street, between East Monument Street and East Madison Street, adjacent to and just south of newly established St. Ignatius Church in the city's historic Mount Vernon-Belvedere neighborhood, and moved to its present "Evergreen" campus in north Baltimore on North Charles Street during 1922. Evening classes commenced in 1942.

=== Expansion ===
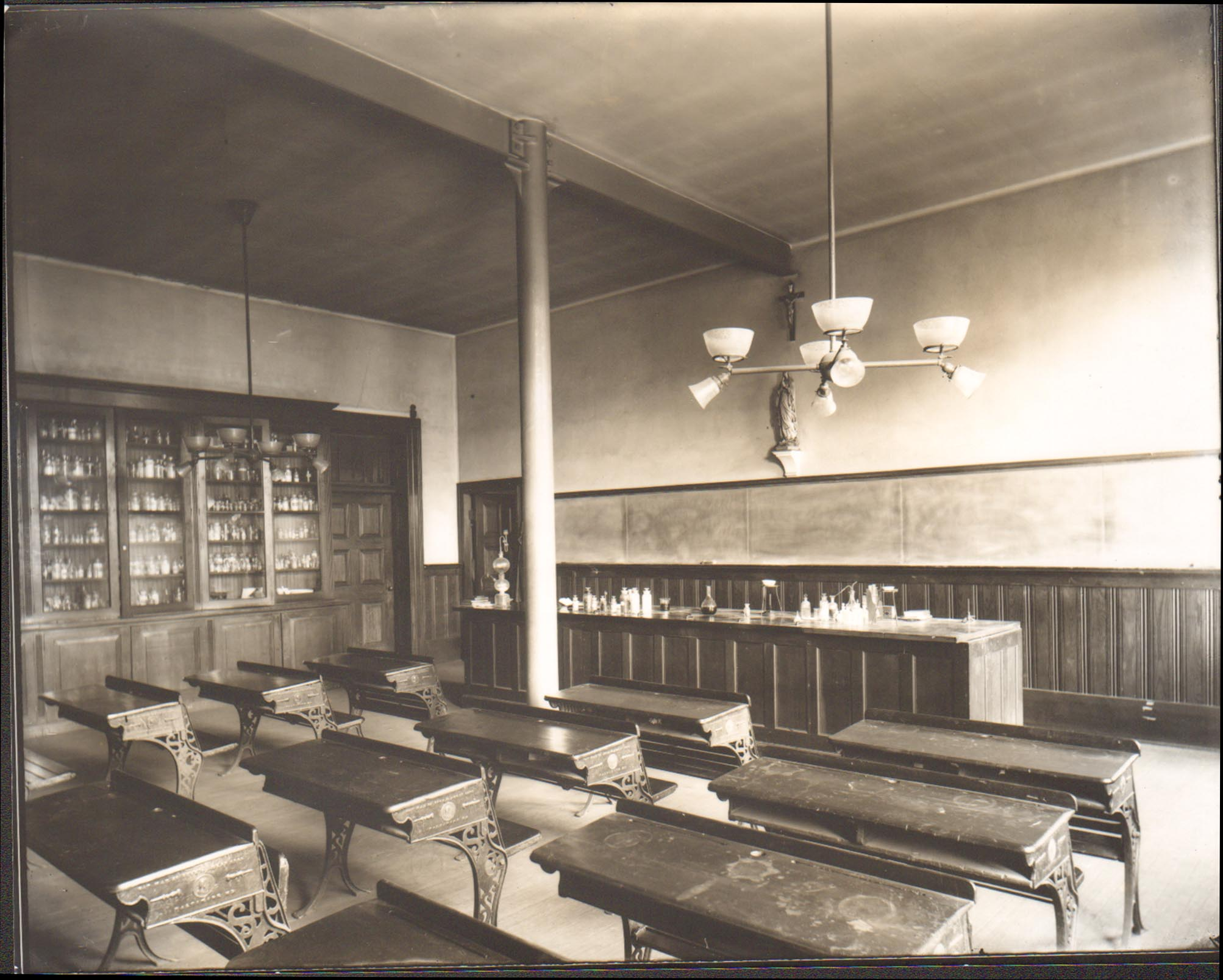
Chemistry lab

During the early 1930s, the high school section moved to nearby Towson, north of Baltimore. In 1949, the college established a graduate division in education, adding a graduate degree program in business management in 1968, a graduate program in speech pathology in 1971, and finance in 1973. Today, the college's list of graduate programs has grown to include psychology, modern studies, pastoral counseling, computer science, and software engineering.

Loyola became coeducational in 1971, following its joining with Mount Saint Agnes College, a neighboring women's college that was experiencing financial difficulties and closed following the joining. That same year, the college's Board of Trustees elected its first lay chairperson.

Working from these foundations, Loyola has transformed itself from a small commuter college into a residential college with an undergraduate population of more than 4,000 students. In 1981, Loyola established a separate business school: The Rev. Joseph A. Sellinger, Jr., School of Business and Management. The school would expand geographically with two graduate centers in Timonium and Columbia, Maryland.

=== Designation change ===
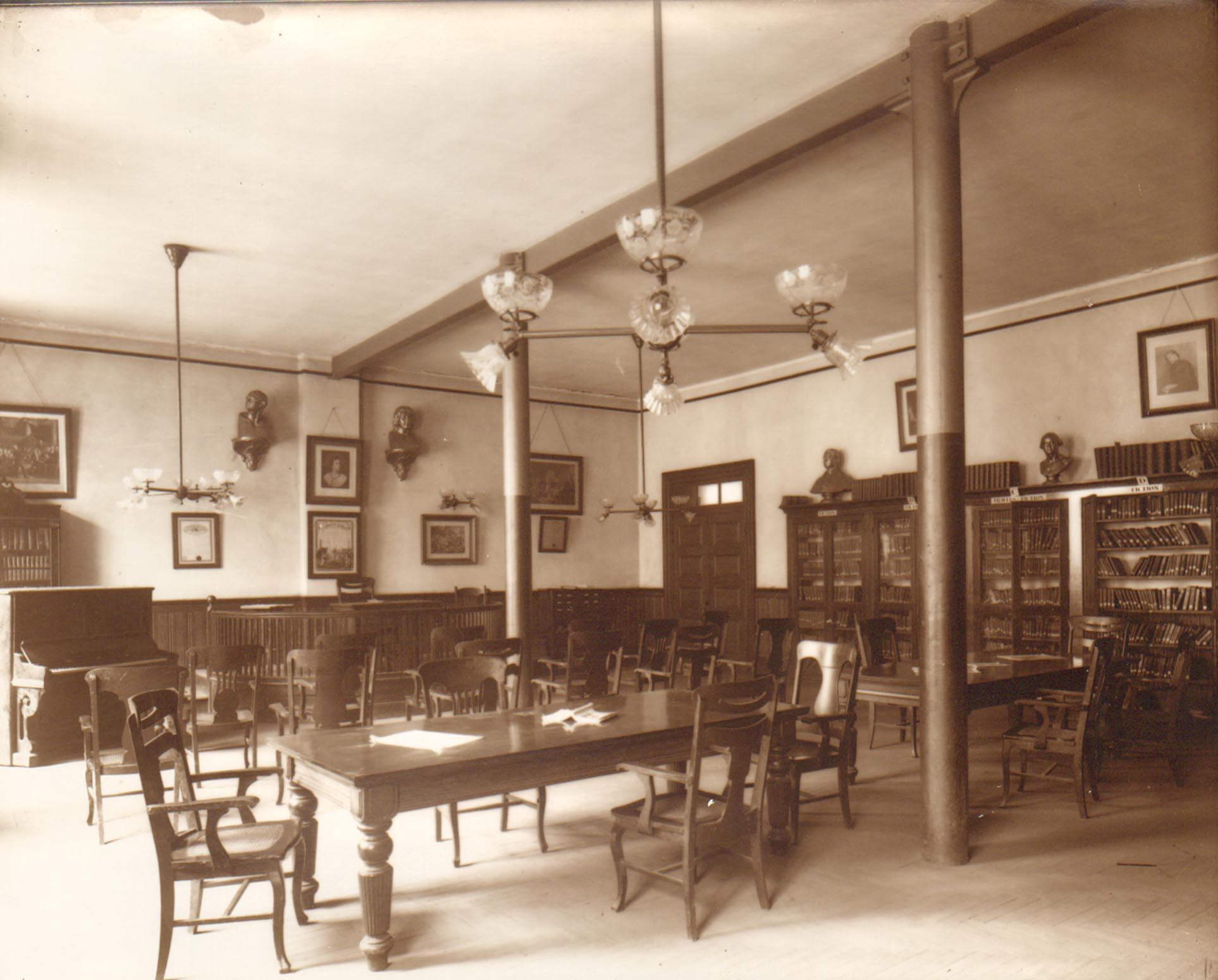
Student library

The Executive Committee of the college's Board of Trustees announced on August 20, 2008 its decision to change the institution's name to Loyola University Maryland. Its request was approved on March 25, 2009 by the Maryland Higher Education Commission, with the change officially taking effect five months later on August 19. The Reverend Brian F. Linnane, SJ, the university's president, stated that the "college" designation no longer fit the school and that its comprehensive array of academic fields, some with graduate programs, was better reflected in its new name.

=== Jesuit tradition ===
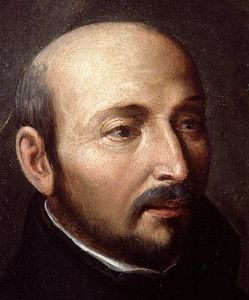
Ignatius of Loyola

The Society of Jesus founded Loyola University Maryland in the tradition of Ignatius of Loyola. The Society of Jesus, and therefore Loyola University Maryland, operate according to the mandate Ad maiorem Dei gloriam (AMDG), directing their ends toward that which brings forth the "greater glory of God." This cornerstone of the Jesuit philosophy functions to remind students that their education is meant to be applied toward the betterment of humanity and God's worship, in particular. Loyola's focus on cura personalis or the whole person's education functions to attain that end. A broad base of knowledge, supported by a strong liberal arts core, prepares Jesuit students to undertake the goal of AMDG.

In keeping with this overarching principle, Loyola undergraduates must complete the core curriculum, including courses in English, philosophy, theology, ethics, history, fine arts, foreign language, mathematics, natural science, and social sciences. Though Loyola encourages plurality, its religious heritage is preserved and cultured by encouraging all of its students and faculty to cultivate and live by the core values of the Society of Jesus.

In 1950, following the admittance of Charles Henry Dorsey Jr., Loyola was awarded the Sidney Hollander Award for its contribution to the establishment of civil and political rights for African Americans in Maryland.

=== Endowment ===
Loyola's endowment's primary financial objective is to provide funds for the current and future support of the university's operations and programs. The endowment consists of approximately 300 individual funds established for various purposes, including both donor-restricted endowment funds and funds designated by the Board of Trustees to function as endowments. As of May 31, 2018, the total assets of the endowment were $228.2 million.

Comprehensive capital campaigns have strengthened Loyola's endowment. The recent Bright Minds, Bold Hearts campaign exceeded $100 million. The campaign, which concluded in May 2018, added over $54 million to the University's endowment, created 115 new scholarships, increased the funding of 55 existing scholarships, enhanced athletic facilities, and strengthened Loyola's academic experience, including programs in peace and justice studies, global studies, and Messina, an interdisciplinary living-learning experience for first-year students The campaign also supported the mission and ministry of the University through investment in the local community and Loyola's York Road Initiative.

== Academics ==
Academic rankings

Master's
- Washington Monthly: 21

Regional
- U.S. News & World Report: 7

National
- Forbes: 175
- WSJ/College Pulse: 19

The foundation of a Loyola education is a broad core program covering basic knowledge and concepts in the humanities, math, and science, and the social sciences. The purpose is to balance general education and specialized study in the major. Undergraduate degrees are awarded in three schools, Loyola College, the School of Education, and the Joseph A. Sellinger, S.J. School of Business and Management. The university operates on a semester system.

=== Loyola College ===
Coinciding with the university's transition to its new name, the College of Arts and Sciences became Loyola College on August 19, 2009. It offers degrees in biology, chemistry, classics, communication, comparative cultures, and literary studies, computer science, economics, education, engineering science, English, fine arts, French, German, global studies, history, an honors program, interdisciplinary studies (including American, Asian, Catholic, film, gender, Latin American/Latino and medieval studies), law, mathematical science, military science, modern languages and literature, nursing, philosophy, physics, political science, pre-health curriculum/programs (including medicine, dentistry, veterinary medicine, and optometry/podiatry), psychology, sociology, Spanish, speech-language pathology/audiology, theology, forensic studies and writing.

=== Sellinger School of Business and Management ===
The Sellinger School

The Sellinger School of Business and Management offers degrees in accounting, business economics, finance, general business, international business, management, management information systems, marketing, and the Sellinger scholars program. In 1984 the business school was formally named the Joseph A. Sellinger, S.J. School of Business and Management in honor of the late Reverend Joseph A. Sellinger, earning accreditation in all programs by AACSB (The International Association for Management Education) in 1988. Loyola is the only private institution in the state of Maryland with a nationally accredited business school. In 1990, the accounting department earned specialized national accreditation from AACSB.

=== School of Education ===
Since 1946 the department of education has been one of the stronger academic pillars at Loyola. With the 2009 name designation change, President Linnane announced The School of Education's opening, which was to be led by Peter C. Murrell, Jr. as the first dean. The School was officially opened on October 14, 2009. The School now offers undergraduate majors in Elementary Education and minors in Secondary Education and Special Education. Its graduate department offers Master of Arts (M.A.), Master of Arts in Teaching (MAT), Master of Education (M.Ed.), the Certificate of Advanced Study in School Management (C.S.M.), and the Certificate of Advanced Study in Education (CASE).

=== Admission ===
More than 10,000 students apply for admission as freshmen for approximately 1,000 spaces. The class of 2013 was the last applicant class that was required to submit SAT scores. The admission office has now begun a four-year pilot program that does not require standardized test scores, deeming them optional.

== Campus ==
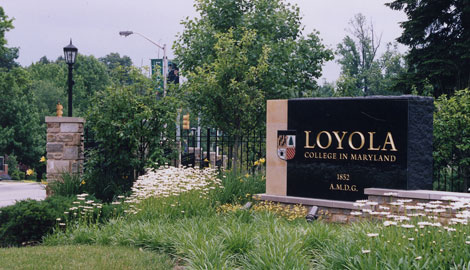
Entrance to the campus

Loyola's Evergreen campus spans 79 acres (320,000 m^{2}) along Charles Street in northern Baltimore. The college also owns 20 acres (81,000 m^{2}) in the mountains of western Maryland, used for the Rising Phoenix Retreat Center. The Loyola Clinical Centers have located just a short drive from the college's main campus, in Belvedere Square. The Clinical Centers offer individuals in the community a broad range of services addressing educational, language, and psychological issues.

At the western side of the Quad on the Evergreen campus lies the Alumni Memorial Chapel of Our Lady. Formally dedicated on September 15, 1952, the chapel features Gothic architectural influences with large stained-glass windows and a long, narrow nave situated along the east-west axis. A statue of Our Lady of Evergreen, Queen of Peace, is situated above the front façade.

On the eastern side of the Quad, and in the center of campus, is the Tudor-style Humanities Center, originally built by the Garrett family in 1895 as a wedding gift for one of their children. Unfortunately, the child died during a trip to England, and the residence became a rehabilitation center for men blinded during the war. In 1921, Loyola's Jesuits purchased the Garretts' Evergreen property and gradually moved the college from its location on Calvert Street. The mansion was originally used for classes but then became the Jesuit residence. In 1955, it suffered severe fire damage and was converted to offices following the restoration. Today, the Humanities Center houses 16 departments, including Admissions, Alumni Relations, Financial Aid, and the Philosophy, Theology, and History departments.

In the northern side of the Quad lies the Sellinger School of Business and Management, which opened in January 2000. The 50,000-square-foot (4,600 m^{2}) facility features a more contemporary style, with Spanish influences, including a soaring, five-story glass façade, open atrium, a four-story glass tower, and three seminar rooms.

On the southern side of the Quad lies Beatty Hall and Jenkins Hall. These buildings used to house classrooms, and Gothic and Edwardian architectural styles heavily influence various departments.

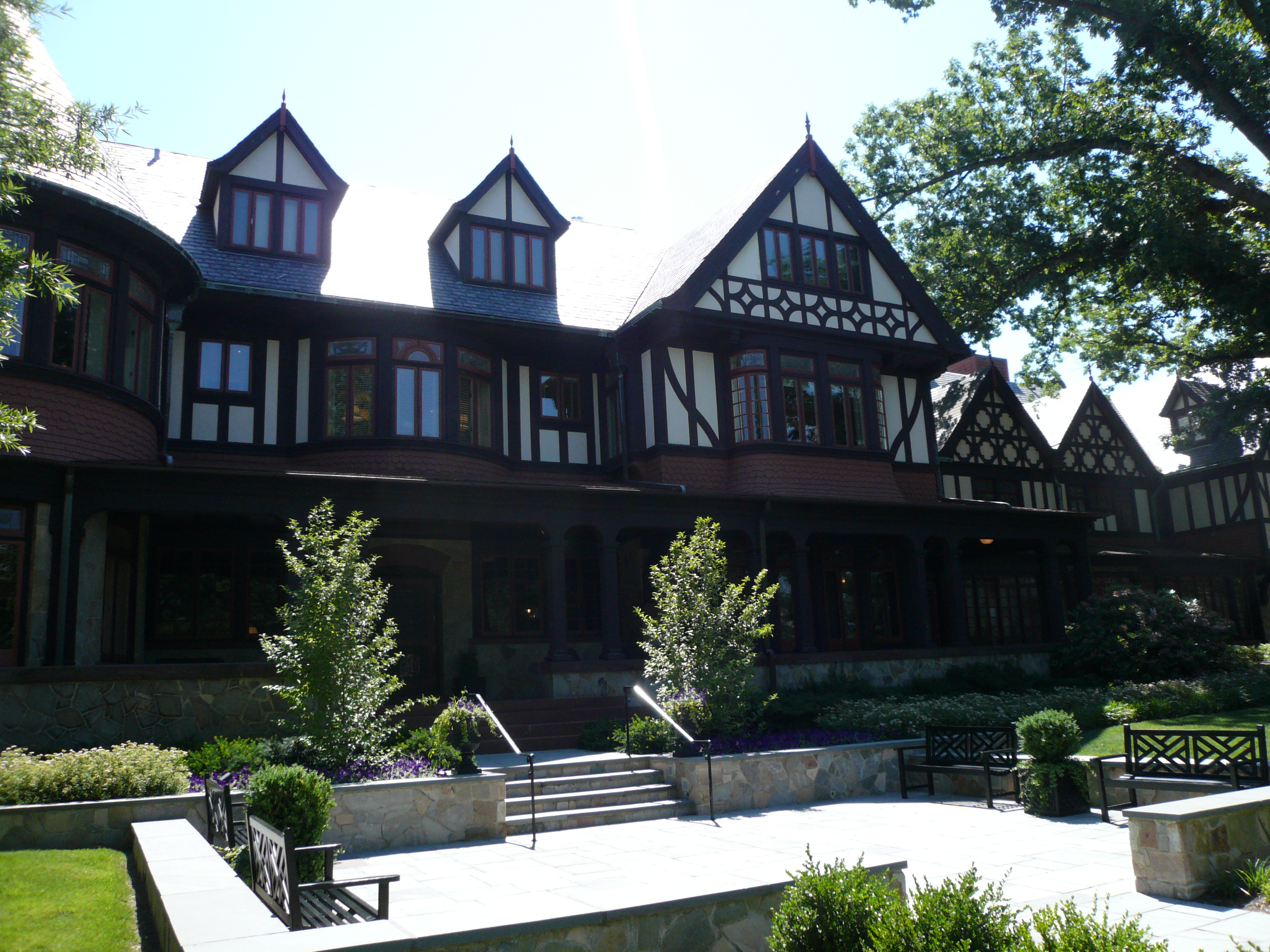
Humanities Center

On the southwest side of the Quad is the Donnelly Science Center. The Donnelly Science Center was originally designed by J. Prentiss Browne, a prominent Baltimore architect, and built-in 1978. The academic building received an expansion in 2011 that included new laboratories.

The dormitories housing students are located west of the main campus and are connected by Loyola's pedestrian bridge (or USF&G Pedestrian Bridge), spanning Charles Street. In most cases, Loyola's dormitories purchased apartment buildings, including Newman Towers, Campion Tower, and Seton Court. Further up North Charles Street is the Fitness and Aquatic Center, which opened in fall 2000, featuring a 6,000-square-foot (560 m^{2}) fitness center with treadmills, bikes, ellipticals, stair climbers, free weights, selectorized weight circuit, and stretching area. The Mangione Aquatic Center features an eight-lane, 25-yard (23 m) swim course; a shallow lane, and diving well as an on-deck sauna and hot tub. The 30-foot (9.1 m) indoor rock climbing wall and bouldering area is designed for all levels.

The FAC also has a two-court gymnasium used for club sports, intramural sports, and informal recreation. The Multi-Activity Court features a sports court surface ideal for indoor soccer, volleyball, and inline sports. The FAC also features an elevated walking/jogging track, two group exercise studios, an Outdoor Adventure Center, classroom and conference room, an equipment room, locker rooms, four racquetball, and two squash courts, and an outdoor grass field.

Loyola's library is a shared facility with the adjacent Notre Dame of Maryland University (formerly College of Notre Dame of Maryland). The Loyola Notre Dame Library, located between the two schools, and features a 100,000-square-foot (9,300 m^{2}) interior; interactive study and instructional spaces; an exhibition area and curatorial space for special collections; expanded stack areas for humanities print collection; a café fully wired for voice, data, and video; five high-tech seminar rooms; digital studio for collaborative student and faculty projects; a media center with 96-seat auditorium; and a 24-seat, fully wired bibliographic classroom.

=== Sustainability ===
The University employs a full-time sustainability coordinator who serves and advises the sustainability committee to advance environmental sustainability on campus. Two roof-top solar panels were installed during the summer of 2008, and a green residence hall features recycled metal beams, a green roof, and geothermal heating and cooling. The student Environmental Action Club works to promote environmental stewardship and sustainability on campus. Loyola also partners with a hybrid-only taxi service to provide additional transportation resources. The University also began offering a Sustainability Management Major in 2020, the first in the state of Maryland. The major is accompanied by the student-run Loyola Sustainability Management Club.

== Student life ==
Loyola's undergraduate body is composed of 3,580 students as of 2008. The racial diversity of the undergraduate student body was 85.0% white, 2.7% Asian, 5.1% black, and 3.4% Hispanic. Ninety-eight percent of freshmen and 81% of all undergraduate students live in college housing.

Loyola has more than 150 clubs and organizations, catering to a range of interests. The college operates a television station, WLOY TV, and a radio station, WLOY on 1620 kHz AM. The Greyhound is Loyola's student-run newspaper. Loyola is also hosting an annual Relay for a Life event, raising $150,000 in 2007. ALANA (African, Latino, Asian and Native American) Student Services provides an array of activities to foster the academic, cultural, personal, spiritual, and leadership development of ALANA students, as well as create and maintain an environment of respect and awareness.

Loyola's ROTC is an elective course taken along with a student's required college courses. Students take one class and one lab each week, plus physical fitness training three times per week. Courses cover everything from the structure of the Army to military operations and tactics. Upon completion of the program, cadets are commissioned as officers in the U.S. Army. They must complete a service period in either the Active Duty, Army Reserve, or Army National Guard. Since its inception in 1952, the ROTC program has commissioned more than 1,100 cadets. Loyola's Army ROTC program has a partnership with Towson University, Notre Dame of Maryland University, and Goucher College.

Sixty-five percent of Loyola's undergraduate students studied abroad during their junior year. Students can choose from 21 different programs, exchanges, and affiliations in 16 countries.

- Loyola-sponsored programs include Alcala, Spain; Auckland, New Zealand; Bangkok, Thailand; Beijing, China; Cork, Ireland; Leuven, Belgium; Copenhagen, Denmark; Melbourne, Australia; Newcastle, England; Paris, France; and Rome, Italy.
- Programs are available for all majors, and students have the option of going for one semester or the entire year. Some programs are taught in English, some in the native language, and some a combination of both.
- Eighty-one percent of Loyola students study abroad, placing it 10th on U.S. News & World Report's "Most students studying abroad" listing.

=== Traditions ===
- Loyolapalooza: Every spring, the SGA hosts a festival on the Quad, which includes carnival-like rides, food, and a musical act. Past years have included The Samples, Guster, Straylight Run & Chris Carrabba, Gavin DeGraw, State Radio, and Citizen Cope.
- Bull & Oyster Roast: An annual alumni event that serves all classes as an on-campus reunion for all Loyola alumni. The event usually occurs in the early weeks of the spring semester and features food, live music, and dancing.
- Battle of Charles Street: The annual men's lacrosse match-up against fellow Baltimore rival, the Johns Hopkins University Blue Jays.
- Midnight Breakfast: This is a weekend tradition where from midnight until 2 a.m., breakfast is served on campus, free of charge for all students. This gives students a chance to meet in the Boulder Garden Cafe for late-night activities.
- Milestone Reunion: Alumni and their families return to campus for their Milestone Reunion every five years since graduation to reconnect, remember, and relive their days on Evergreen. The reunion takes place the first weekend in June each year. Alumni celebrating their 50-year reunion are invited to a special ceremony and a dinner-dance to induct them as Golden Greyhounds.
- Chordbusters: A twice-a-year concert where the male and female a cappella groups perform a set of songs. The concert happens at the end of each semester every year and features a comedic skit from each group and their arranged songs. The male group is called The Chimes and the female group is called The Belles.
- Black Student Association (BSA) Fashion Show: A one-night-only, student-led fashion show. The show aims to promote and celebrate diversity, where it is centered one a theme to focus on people of color.

=== Activism ===
Students at Loyola are very involved with advocacy and fundraising at a small and large level. The largest annually held event is called Relay For Life, which is a nationwide fundraising program for cancer research. As a university, Loyola has donated the most money in both 2006 and 2007.

== Center for Community Service and Justice ==
Center for Community Service and Justice
- Abbreviation: CCSJ
- Predecessor: Center for Values and Service
- Established: 1992; 34 years ago
- Location(s): 4501 North Charles St. Baltimore, Maryland
- Director: Erin O'Keefe
- Immersion: Director, Christina Harrison
- Main organ: CCSJ Booklet
- Affiliations: Loyola University Maryland; Society of Jesus, Catholic
- Website: CCSJ

More than half of the student population has participated in some community service activity during their time at Loyola. The Center for Community Service and Justice advances this Jesuit university's objective of educating for the faith by offering a program of events and service experiences that supplement the classroom experience, engaging students by developing service opportunities a wide variety of areas. The center offers nearly 40 ongoing community service programs, more than 15 one-time service opportunities throughout the year, and several immersion programs. Students also can become involved through service learning, which pairs community service with academic coursework. In 2015 Loyola was rated by US News as among the top 25 colleges and universities for service learning.

The Center for Community Service and Justice is involved in several activities. Some examples include the Beans and Bread Center, which hosts 300 Baltimore's poor for a meal each day. Loyola provides food and helps for this once a month. The Our Daily Bread Employment Center offers a meal, literacy training, general education, finding a job, and substance abuse recovery assistance. Volunteers from Loyola help with the meal program on scheduled Saturdays. The Immigration Awareness & Advocacy Events include scheduled discussions and advocacy on issues such as the rights of migrant farmworkers, sex trafficking, and the situation of undocumented workers. The York Road Community Days involves students in improving the inner-city landscape, while building community with local churches and schools. Youth Education Awareness consists of service and advocacy opportunities, speakers, and panel discussions on the root causes of systemic problems affecting the schools and youth in Baltimore.

During Spring Break, some activities that occur include Spring Break Outreach, Encounter El Salvador, a program in which students live with a rural family in El Salvador for a week, and Experience: Baltimore, which occurs in late August and involves introducing students to the various neighborhoods and the socioeconomic issues facing Baltimore, through various activities including service and conversations with the people.

== Athletics ==
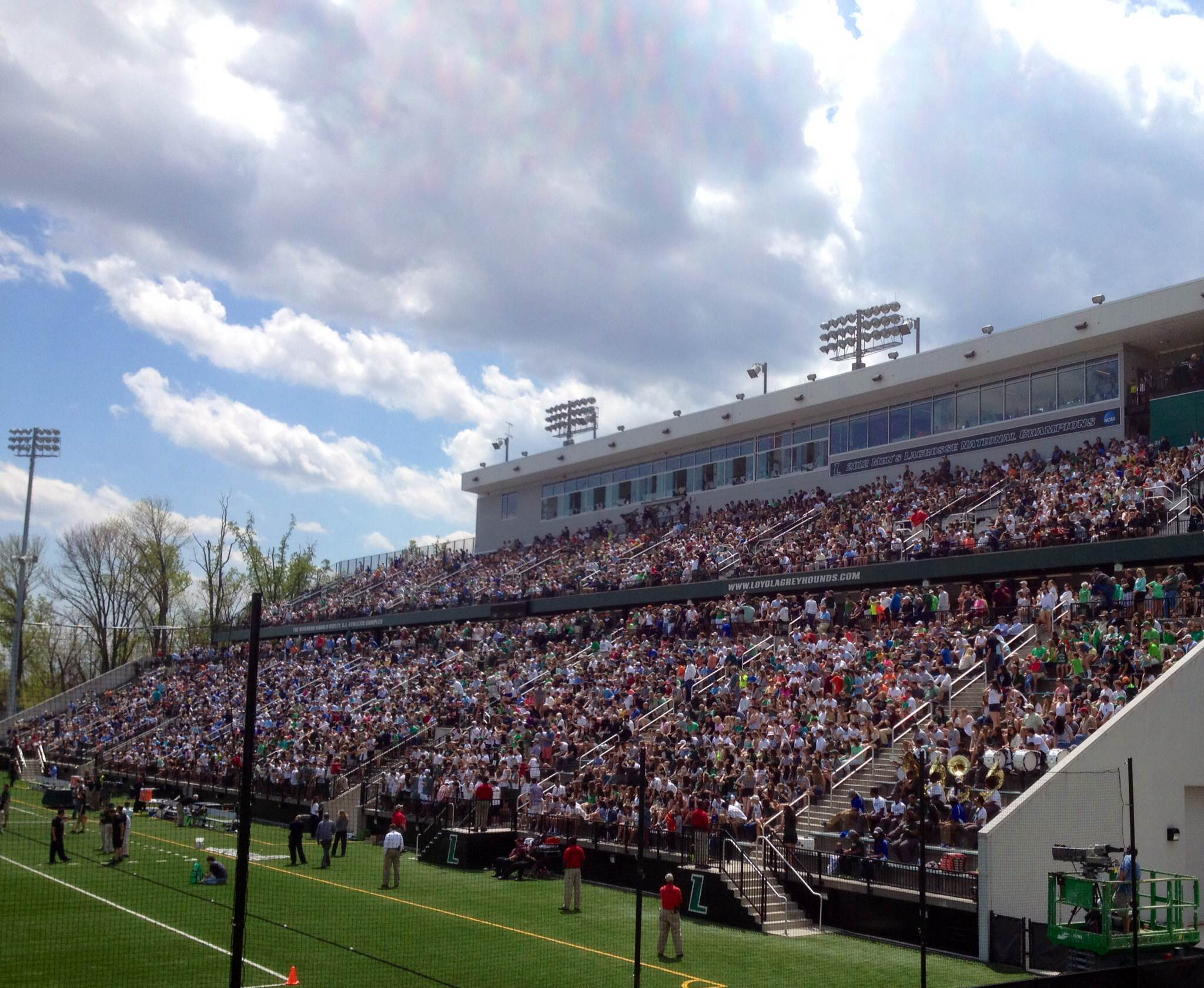
The Ridley Athletic Complex

Loyola fields 17 varsity teams and 22 club teams. The varsity teams participate in the NCAA's Division I. All became members of the Patriot League on July 1, 2013. Previously all but two competed in the Metro Atlantic Athletic Conference (MAAC) from 1989 to 2013. The exceptions were the lacrosse teams – the men in the ECAC Lacrosse League and the women in the Big East Conference. The transition to a new conference was announced on August 29, 2012. Loyola has a student success rate for graduation of over 97% of its student athletes. The school's mascot is a Greyhound, and field sports are played at the Ridley Athletic Complex, located a few minutes from the Evergreen Campus on Cold Spring Lane. Loyola's men's and women's lacrosse teams are particularly noteworthy as both have appeared in numerous NCAA tournaments and are highly ranked most years. The men's lacrosse team won the NCAA Division I National Championship in 2012.

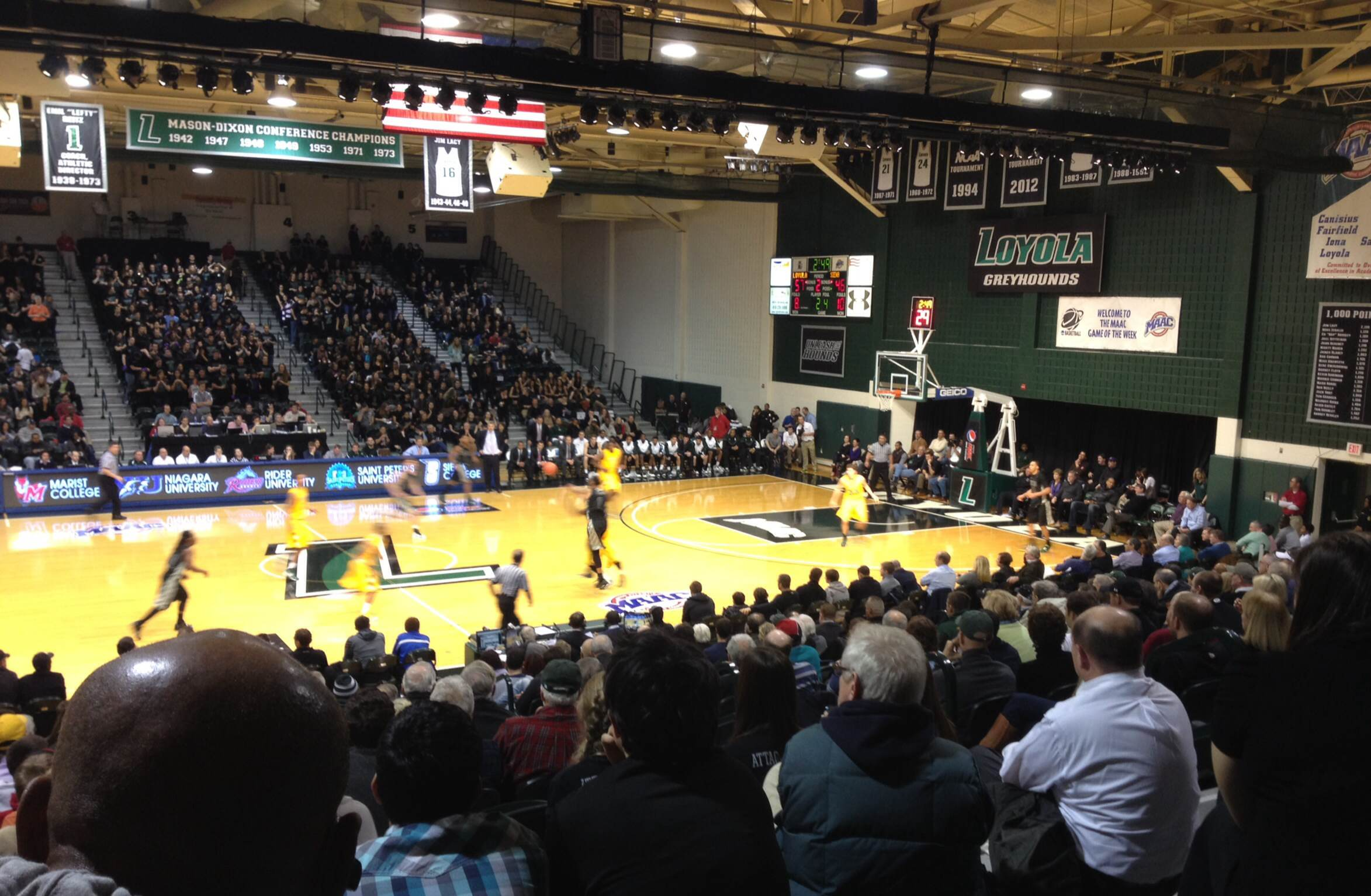
Reitz Arena

The men's soccer team has also enjoyed a great deal of success over time, winning the NCAA Division II National Championship in 1976, appearing various times in the NCAA Division I Tournament, and garnering several national rankings since its ascension into Division I in 1982. They also won against American to take the Patriot League tournament title home for the first time in 2021, and faced North Carolina in the NCAA tournament.

Philip Scholz, a Paralympian, is an alumnus of the varsity men's swimming team. Scholz is blind and holds various records for Paralympic swimming. Joe Wise, a paralympian, is a former student (2011–2015) and a member of the Loyola University Men's Swim Team. Wise is a resident of Austin, Texas. Wise swam in the 2008 Beijing Paralympics and the 2012 London Paralympic Games. He holds several records for swimming in the United States. Katie Hoff, an Olympic medal winner, coached swimming at Loyola and attended classes at the school before leaving Baltimore to live in Fullerton, California. Brennan Morris, a member of the US National Team, is also a record-setting member of the swim team.

Loyola Maryland's basketball team, under the leadership of Tavaras Hardy and the on-court presence of Santi Aldama, led them to the Patriot League Championship game after finishing 9th in the regular season. Santi Aldama scored 33 points in the Patriot League semifinals against Army, in a game where Loyola scored 67 points total. They also beat top-ranked Navy led by Ed Dechellis in their first game, who was at the time undefeated in the Patriot League that season. It was the most remarkable stretch of Loyola basketball since entering the Patriot League.

Loyola's Men's and Women's Rugby Teams have achieved national rankings operating under a unique model where both men's and women's teams share resources including Sean Lugano Memorial Field, an air dome facility suitable for all-weather play.

== Notable faculty ==
- Kelly DeVries, Professor of History, is a well known expert in medieval studies and weaponry and has appeared on numerous occasions for commentary on The History Channel.
- Diana Schaub is a professor of political science at Loyola University Maryland. Schaub received her Ph.D. from the University of Chicago. She teaches and writes on a wide range of issues in political philosophy and American political thought.
- Karsonya "Kaye" Wise Whitehead is an American educator, author, radio host, speaker, and documentary filmmaker. She is the founding director of The Karson Institute for Race, Peace, and Social Justice at Loyola University Maryland and is an Associate Professor of Communication and African and African American Studies.
- Robert J. Wicks, Professor of Pastoral Counseling; leading writer about the intersection of spirituality and psychology; recipient of Papal Pro Ecclesia et Pontifice medal.

== Notable alumni ==
Loyola has approximately 70,000 living alumni worldwide. Notable Loyola alumni include: Mark Bowden, 1999 National Book Award finalist for Black Hawk Down; Tom Clancy, best-selling author of the Jack Ryan series of novels; Michael D. Griffin, former Administrator (highest-ranked official) of NASA; Harry Markopolos, financial investigator who sounded alarm about the Bernie Madoff Ponzi scheme; Jim McKay, former 12-time Emmy-Award-winning host of ABC's Wide World of Sports; Jerry Parr, former Special Agent in Charge Head of the White House Detail for the US Secret Service; professional basketball players Santi Aldama, Cam Spencer, and Pat Spencer; and Herbert O'Conor, 51st Governor of Maryland.

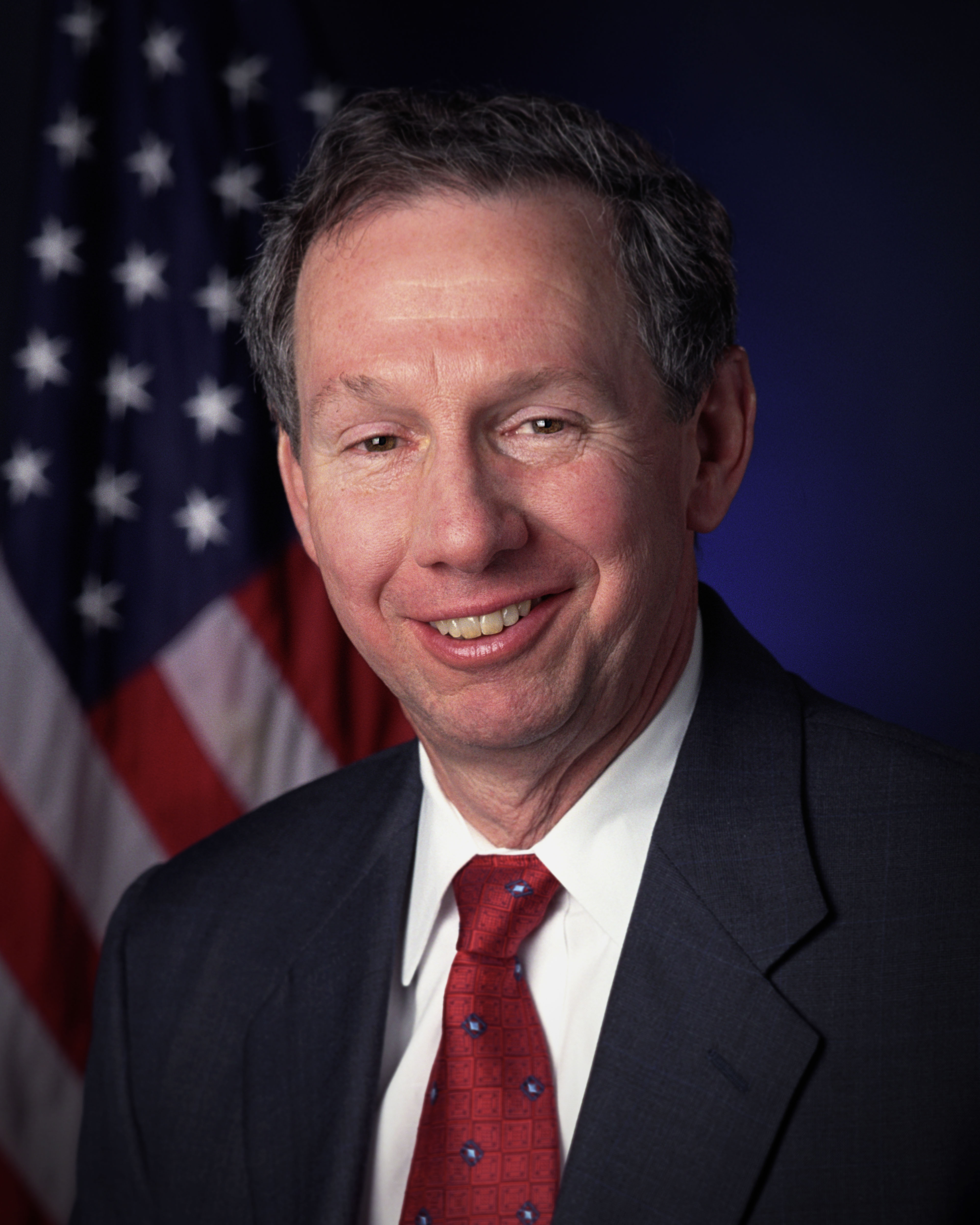
Michael D. Griffin
Administrator of NASA

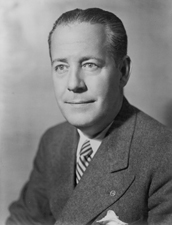
Herbert O'Conor,
51st Governor of Maryland

== See also ==
- List of Jesuit sites
- National Catholic Educational Association
