= Walters Art Museum =

Art museum in Baltimore, Maryland, US

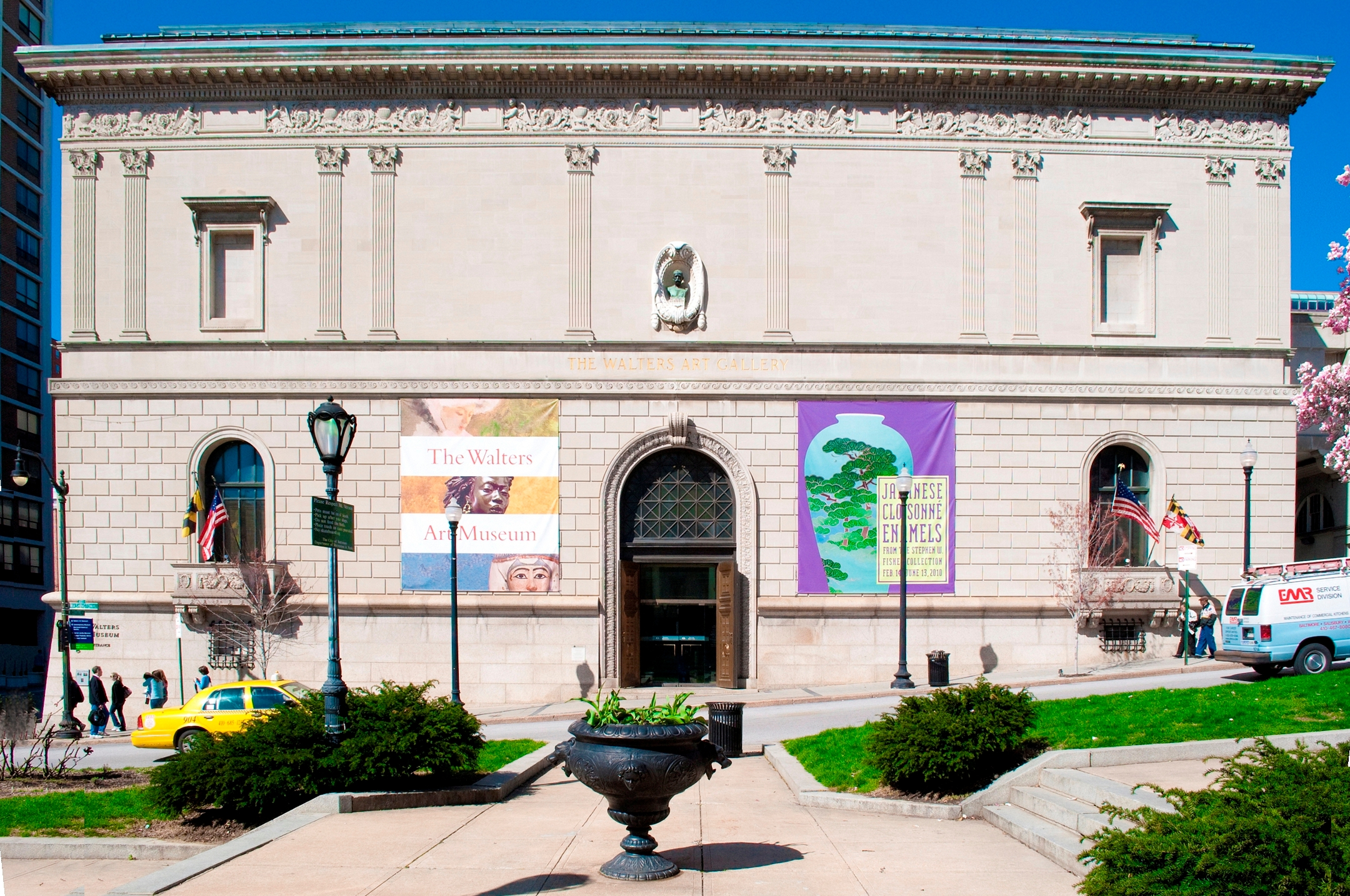
- Museum entrance, North Charles Street, Baltimore
- Interactive fullscreen map
- Former name: The Walters Art Gallery
- Established: 1934
- Location: Mount Vernon, Baltimore, Maryland, U.S.
- Coordinates: 39°17′47″N 76°36′59″W
- Type: Art museum
- Director: Kate Burgin
- Public transit access: at Mt. Vernon station BaltimoreLink routes Green, Pink, Silver, 51, 95, 103, 410, 411; Charm City Circulator Purple Route
- Website: thewalters.org

The Walters Art Museum is a public art museum located in the Mount Vernon neighborhood of Baltimore, Maryland. Founded and opened in 1934, it holds collections from the mid-19th century that were amassed substantially by major American art and sculpture collectors, including William Thompson Walters and his son Henry Walters. William Walters began collecting when he moved to Paris as a nominal Confederate loyalist at the outbreak of the American Civil War in 1861, and Henry Walters refined the collection and made arrangements for the construction what ultimately was Walters Art Museum.

Admission to the museum is free.

== History ==
After allowing the Baltimore public to occasionally view his father's and his growing added collections at his West Mount Vernon Place mansion during the late 1800s, Henry Walters arranged for an elaborate stone palazzo-styled structure to be built for this purpose in 1905–1909, located a block south of the Walters mansion on West Monument Street/Mount Vernon Place, on the northwest corner of North Charles Street at West Centre Street.

The mansion and gallery were also just south and west of the landmark Washington Monument in the Mount Vernon-Belvedere neighborhood, just north of the downtown business district and northeast of Cathedral Hill. Upon his 1931 death, Henry Walters bequeathed the entire collection of then more than 22,000 works, the original Charles Street Gallery building, and his adjacent townhouse/mansion just across the alley to the north on West Mount Vernon Place to the City of Baltimore, "for the benefit of the public". The collection includes masterworks of ancient Egypt, Greek sculpture and Roman sarcophagi, medieval ivories, illuminated manuscripts, Renaissance bronzes, Old Master European and 19th-century paintings, Chinese ceramics and bronzes, Art Deco jewelry, and ancient Near East, Mesopotamian, or ancient Middle East items. Dorothy Miner became its first Keeper of Manuscripts in 1934 and held the post until her death in 1973.

In 2000, "The Walters Art Gallery" changed its long-time name to "The Walters Art Museum" to reflect its image as a large public institution and eliminate confusion among some of the increasing out-of-state visitors. The following year, "The Walters" (as it is often known locally) reopened its original main building after a dramatic three-year physical renovation and replacement of internal utilities and infrastructure. The Archimedes Palimpsest was on loan to the Walters Art Museum from a private collector for conservation and spectral imaging studies.

Starting on October 1, 2006, the museum was enabled to make admission free to all, year-round, as a result of substantial grants given by Baltimore City and the surrounding suburban Baltimore County arts agencies and authorities. In 2012, "The Walters" released nearly 20,000 of its own images of its collections on a Creative Commons license, and collaborated in their upload to the world-wide web and the Internet on Wikimedia Commons. This was one of the largest and most comprehensive such releases made by any museum.

In 2021, several employees fell ill from toxic vapors related to on-site museum construction.

Throughout 2021, director Julia Marciari-Alexander, advised by law firm Shaw Rosenthal LLP, refused to meet with Walters employees, stalling the advance of a wall-to-wall unionization effort. In October 2021, when directed by the Baltimore City Council and Comptroller Bill Henry to meet with employees and allow a vote on unionization, Marciari-Alexander refused, claiming that meeting with her employees constitutes interference. It was later stated that if the unionization effort was successful, workers would be represented by AFSCME Council 67, which would also represent workers at Baltimore Museum of Art and Enoch Pratt Free Library.

== Permanent collection ==
=== Ancient art ===
The Walters' collection of ancient art includes examples from Egypt, Nubia, Greece, Rome, Etruria and the Near East. Highlights include two monumental 3,000-pound statues of the Egyptian lion-headed fire goddess Sekhmet on long-term loan from the British Museum; the Walters Mummy; alabaster reliefs from the palace of Ashurnasirpal II; Greek gold jewelry, including the Greek bracelets from Olbia on the shores of the Black Sea; the Praxitelean Satyr; a large assemblage of Roman portrait heads; a Roman bronze banquet couch, and marble sarcophagi from the tombs of the prominent Licinian and Calpurnian families.

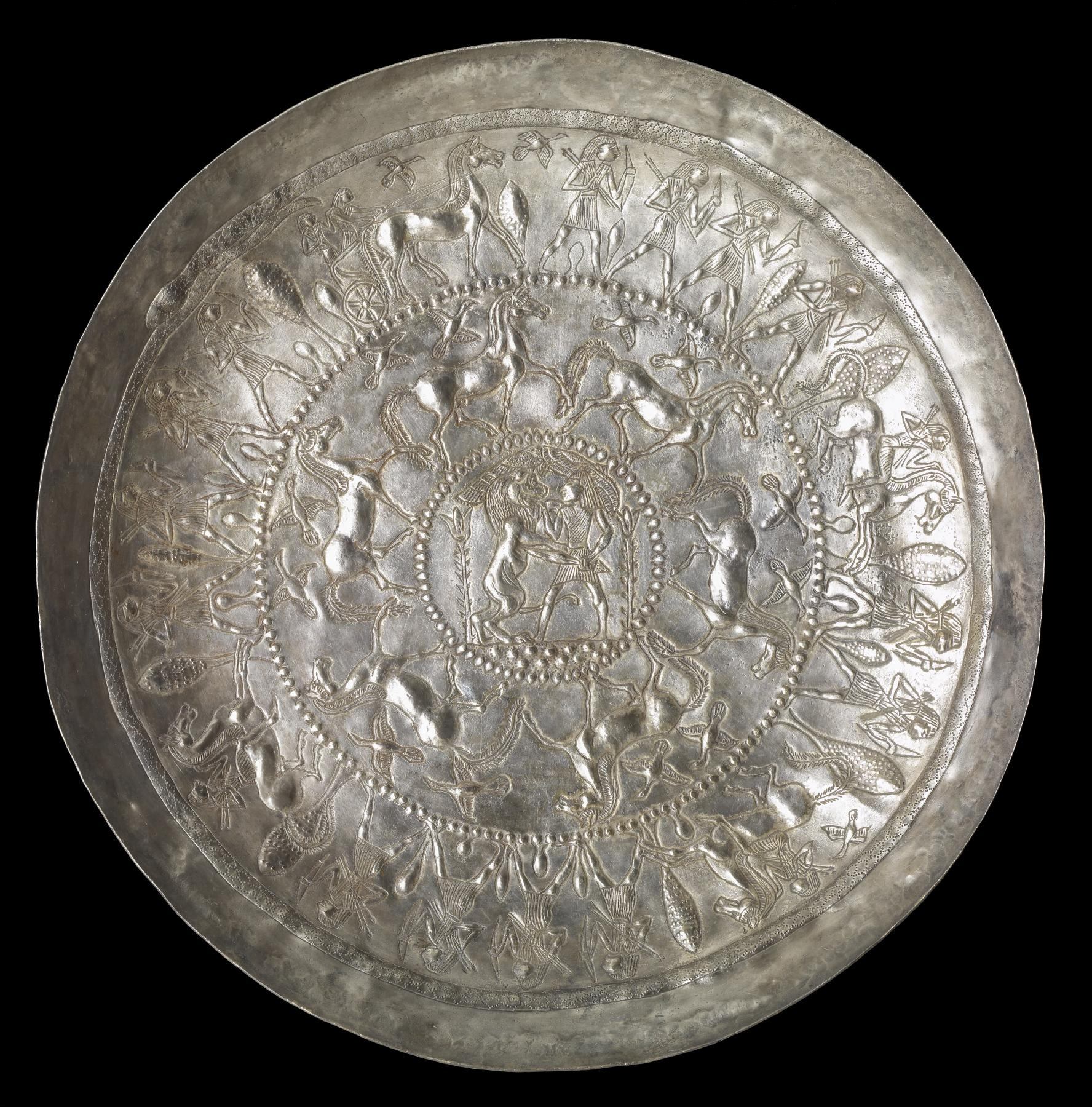
Phoenician metal bowls

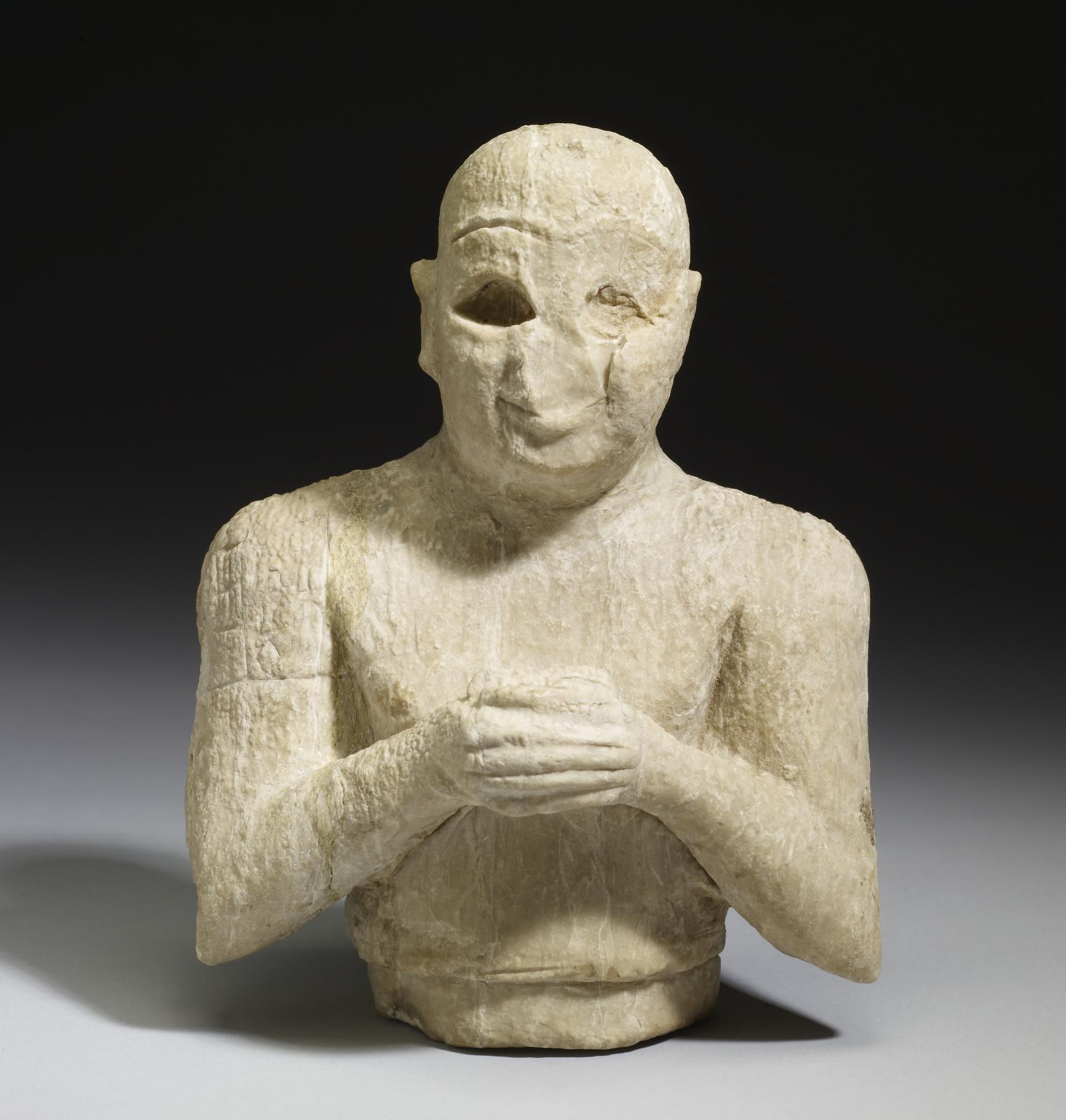
Sumerian male worshiper, c. 2300 BC

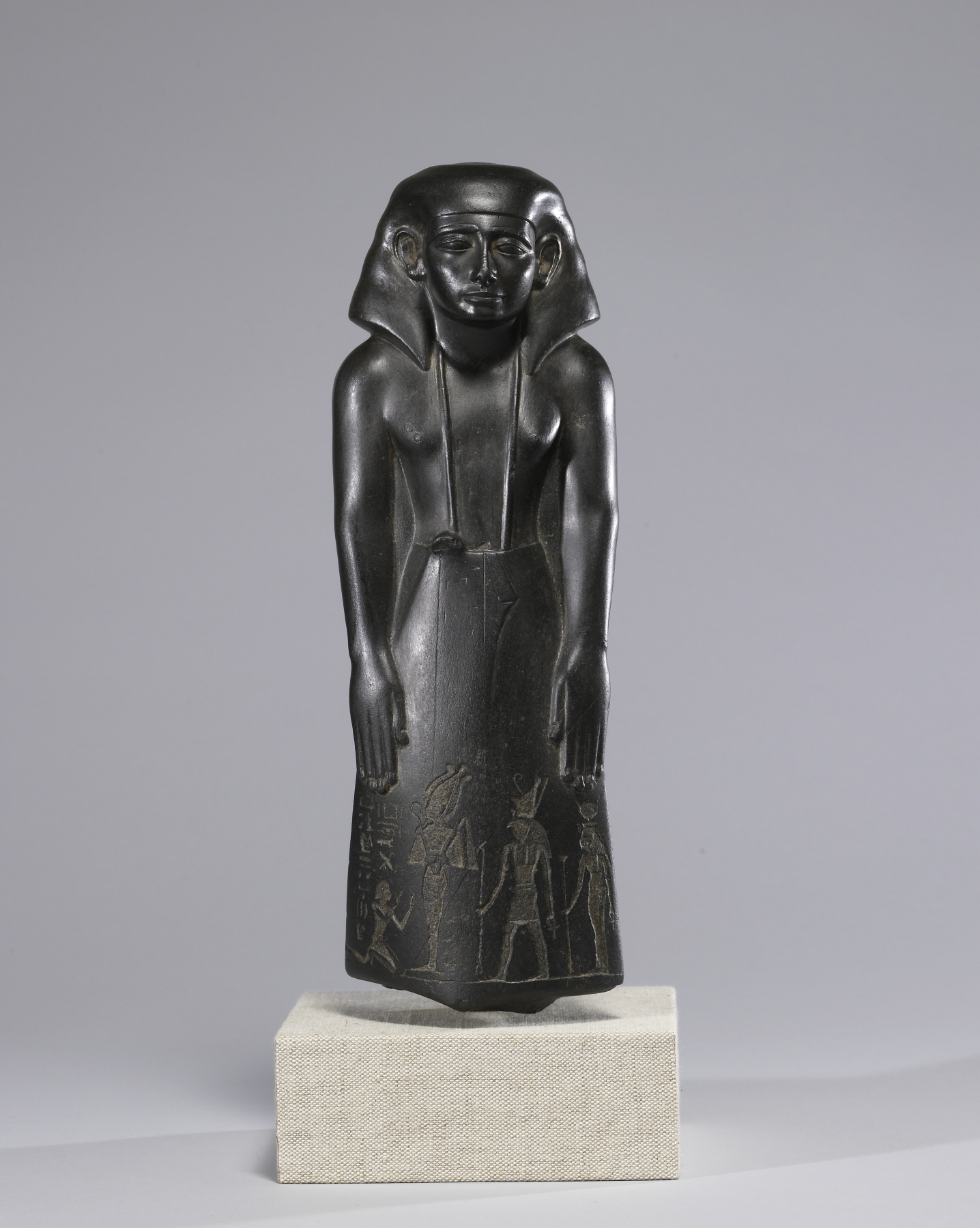
Padiiset's Statue, illustrates Canaan - Ancient Egypt trade, c. 1700 B.C. (inscription c. 900 B.C.)

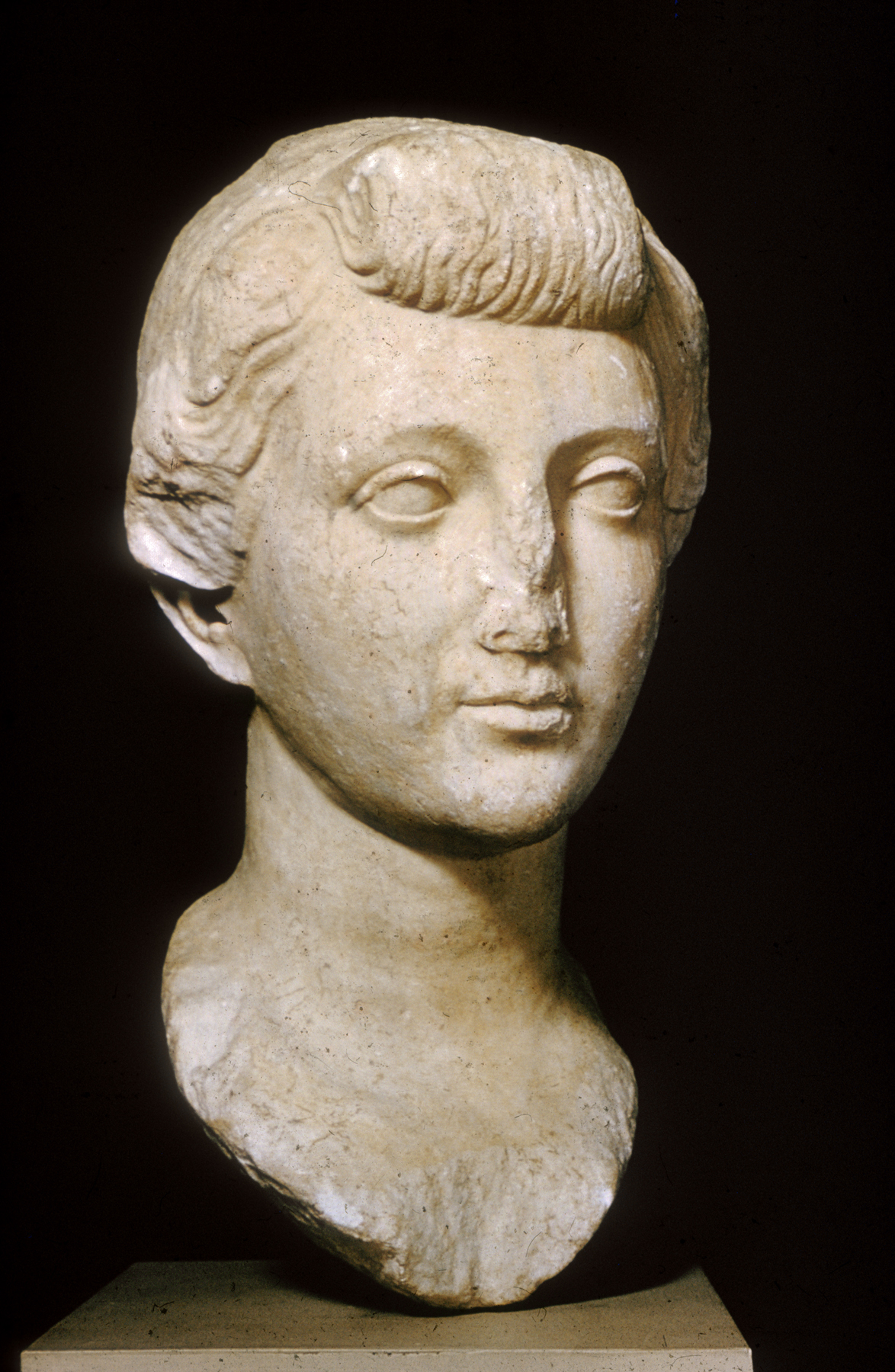
Portrait bust of Livia, wife of Emperor/Caesar Augustus, (Octavius), c. 35 B.C.

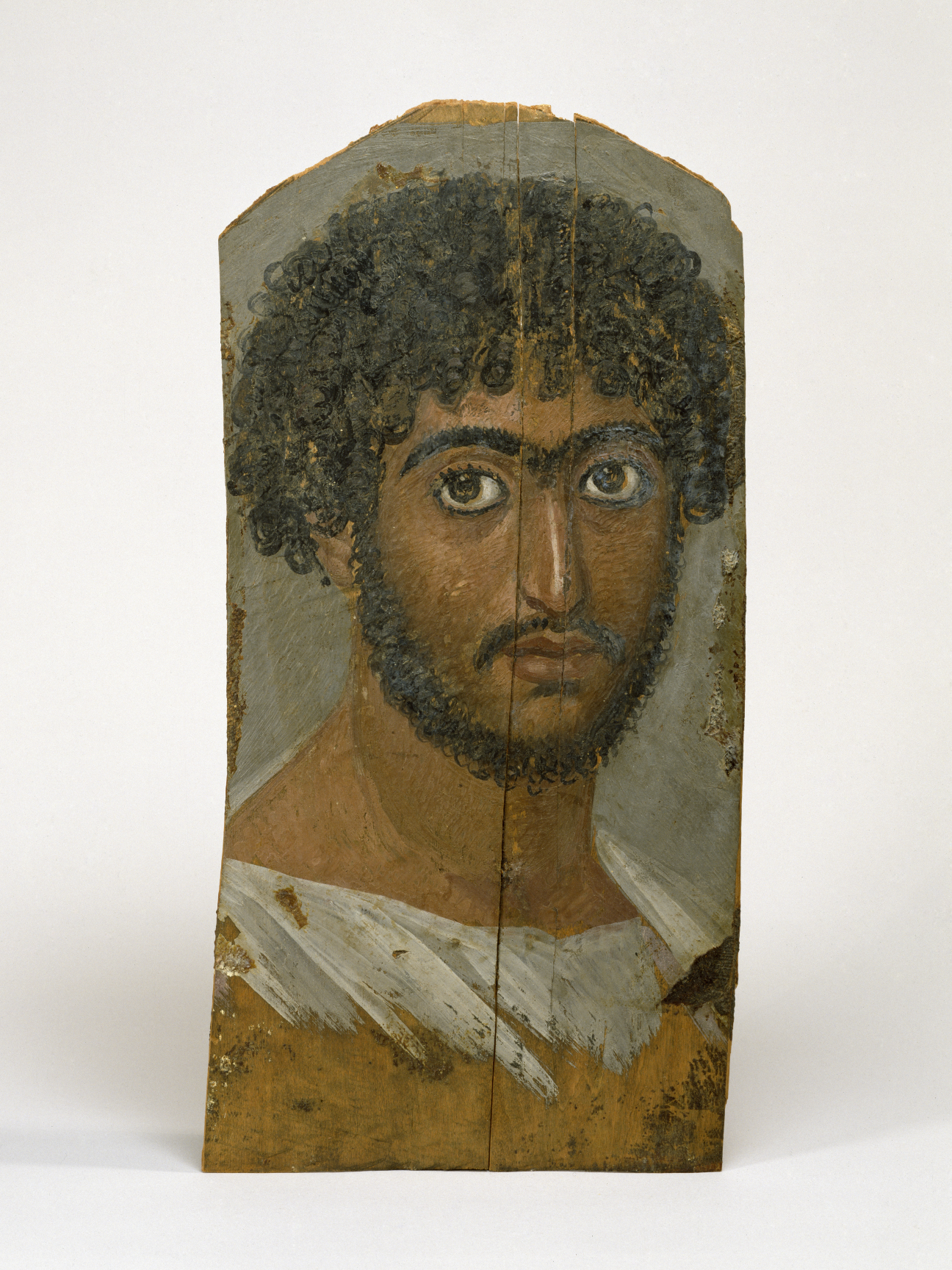
Al Fayum mummy portrait, Roman Egypt, c. A.D. 175

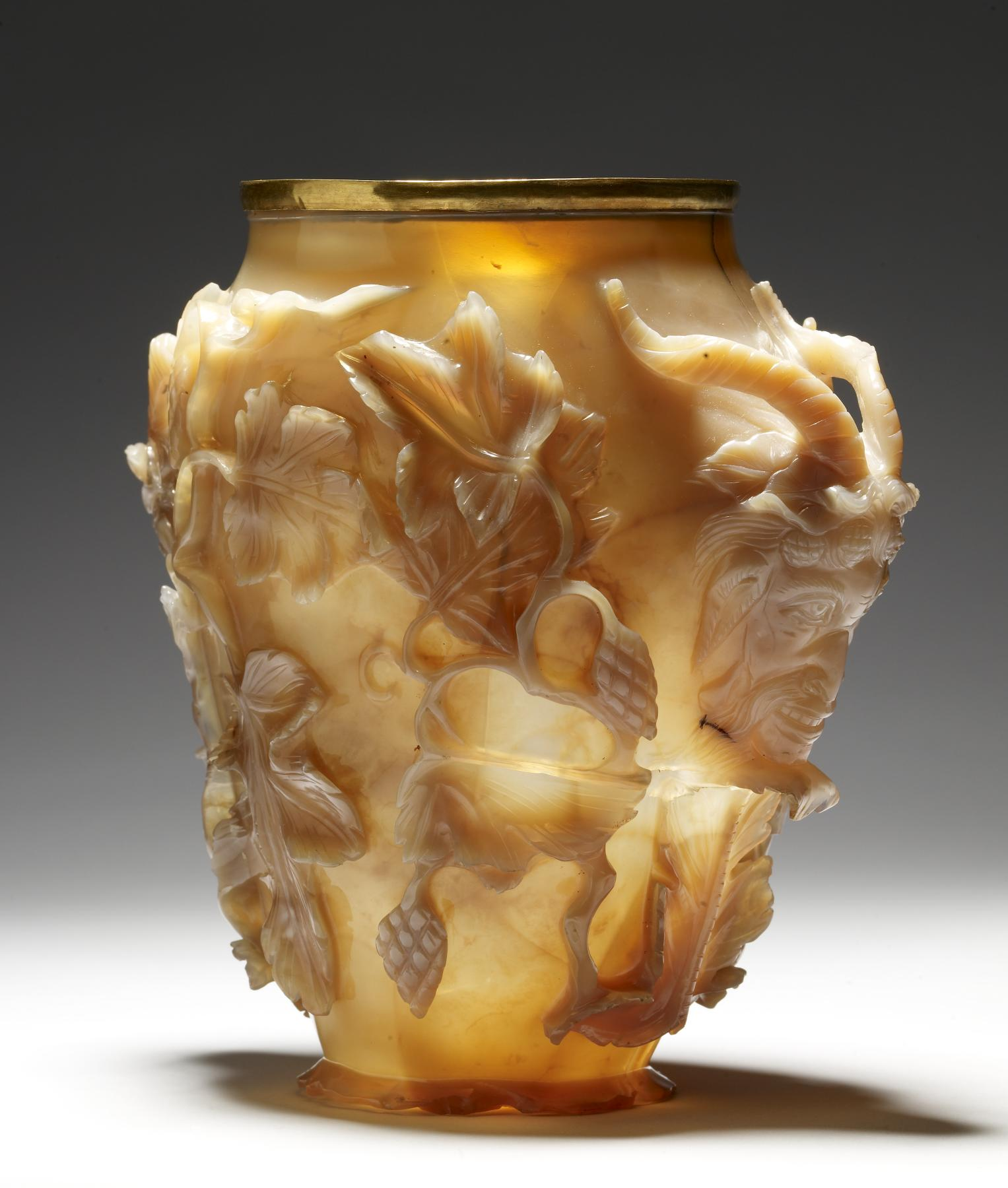
The Rubens Vase, an agate hardstone carving of c. A.D. 400

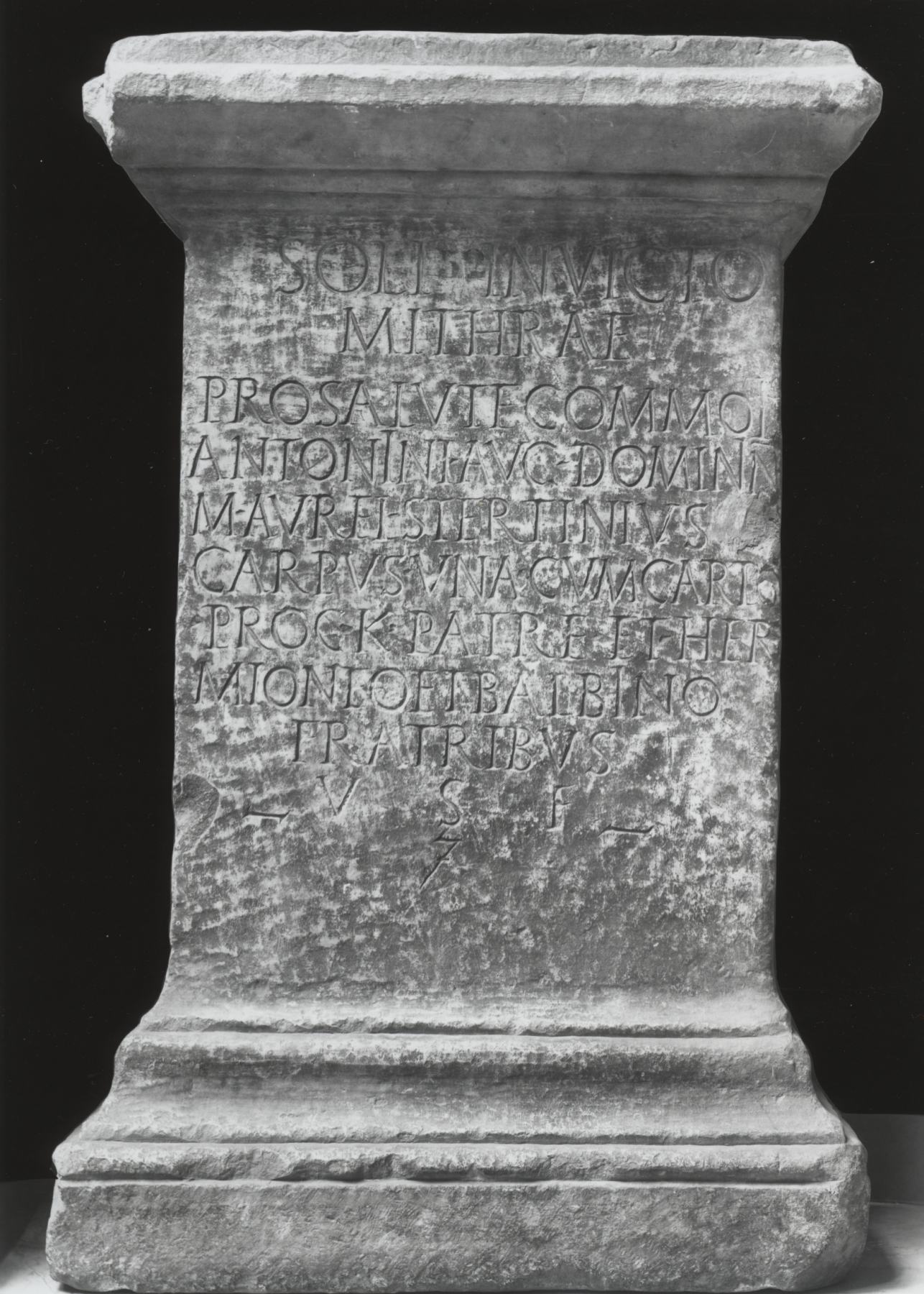
Roman stele with Latin inscription referring to Mithras

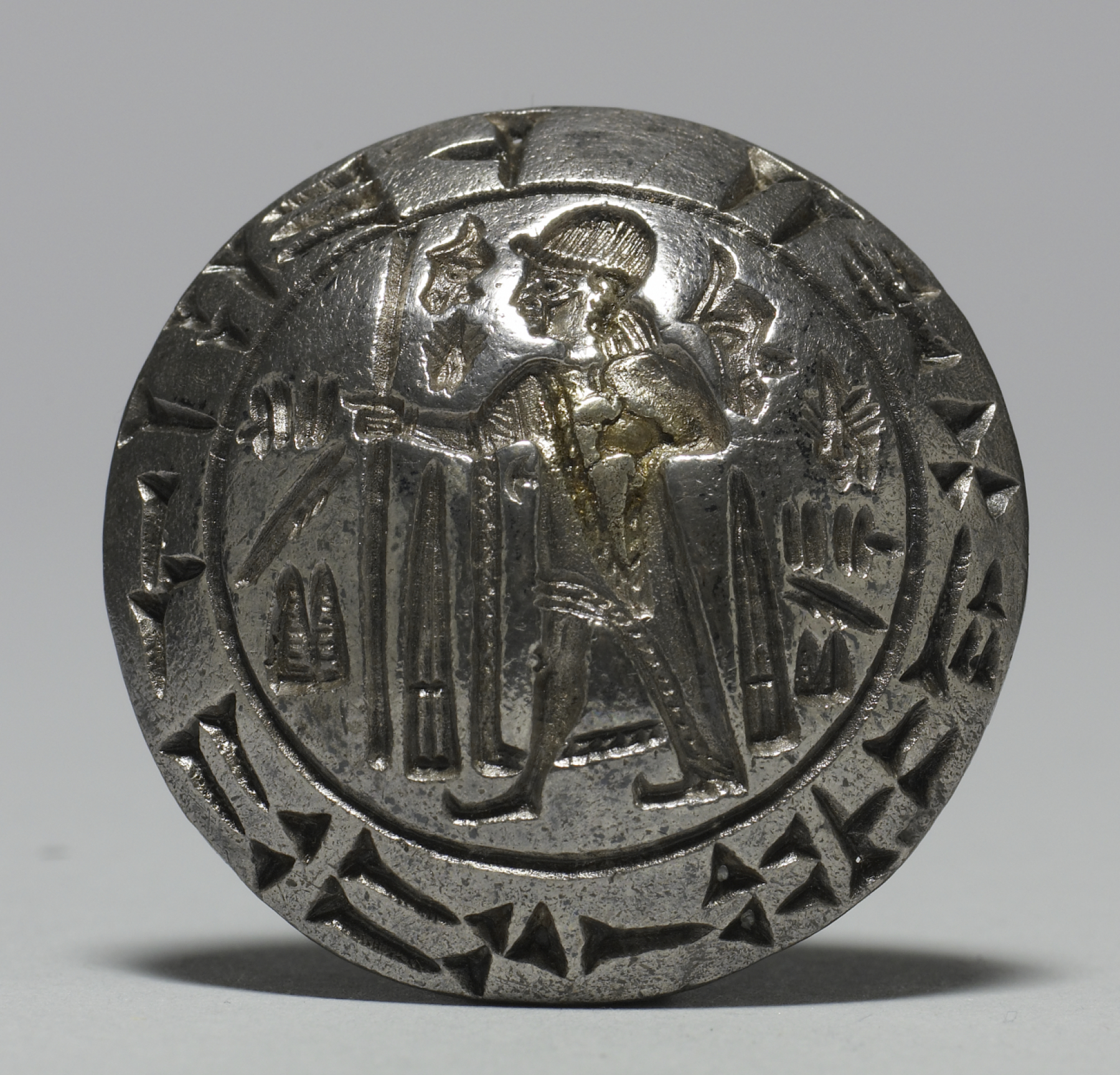
An Anatolian hieroglyph inscription alongside Hittite cuniform; this famous bilingual inscription provided the first clues for deciphering Anatolian hieroglyphs

=== Art of the ancient Americas ===
In 1911, Henry Walters purchased almost 100 gold artifacts from the Chiriqui region of western Panama in Central America, creating a core collection of ancient American native art. Through subsequent gifts of art and loans, the museum has added works, mostly in pottery and stone, from Mexico, Central America and South America, including pieces from the Mesoamerican Olmec, Aztec, and Maya cultures, as well as the Moche and Inca peoples of South America.

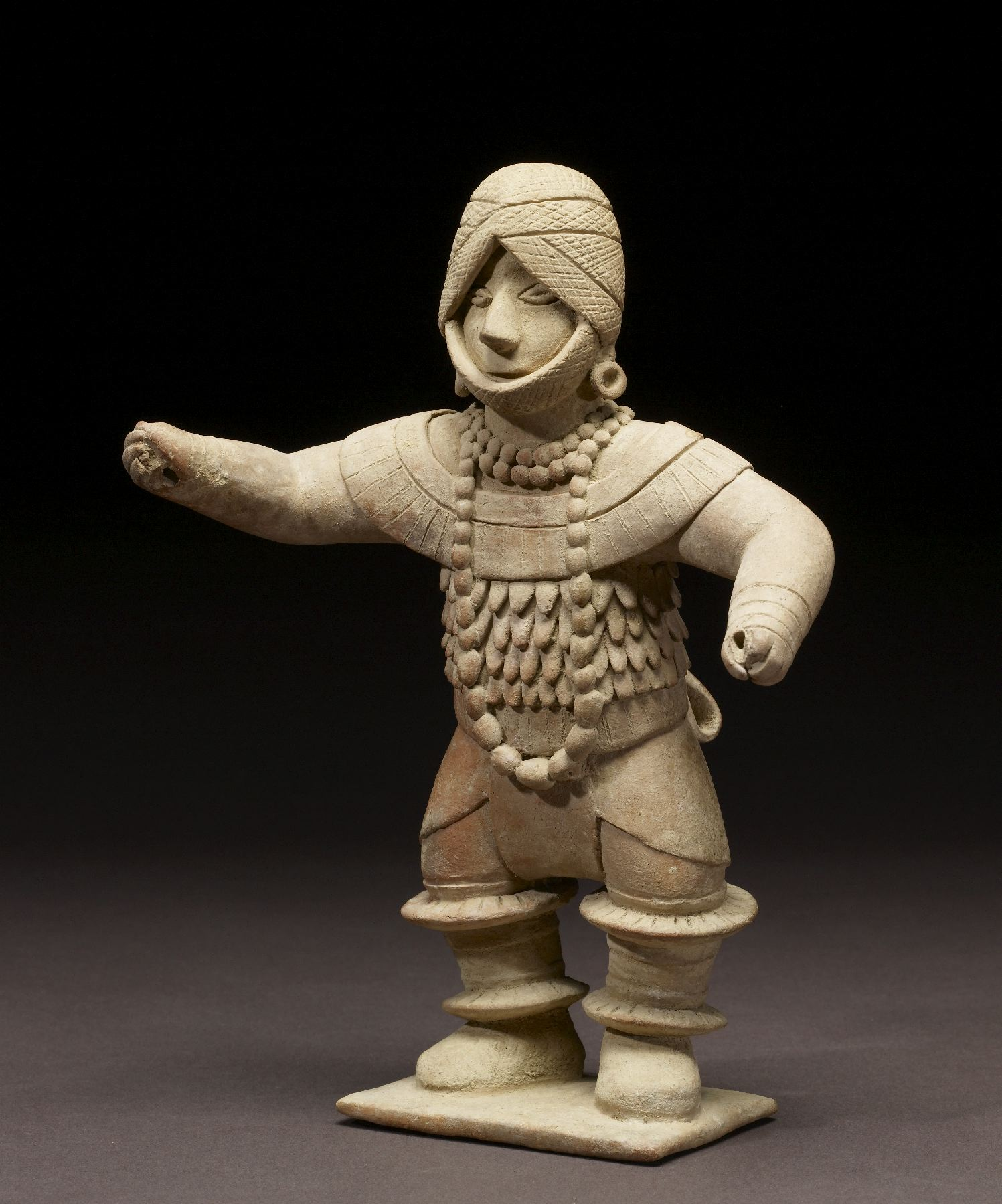
Whistle in the form of a dancing figure from Colima, Mexico, pottery, c. 300 BC – AD 200

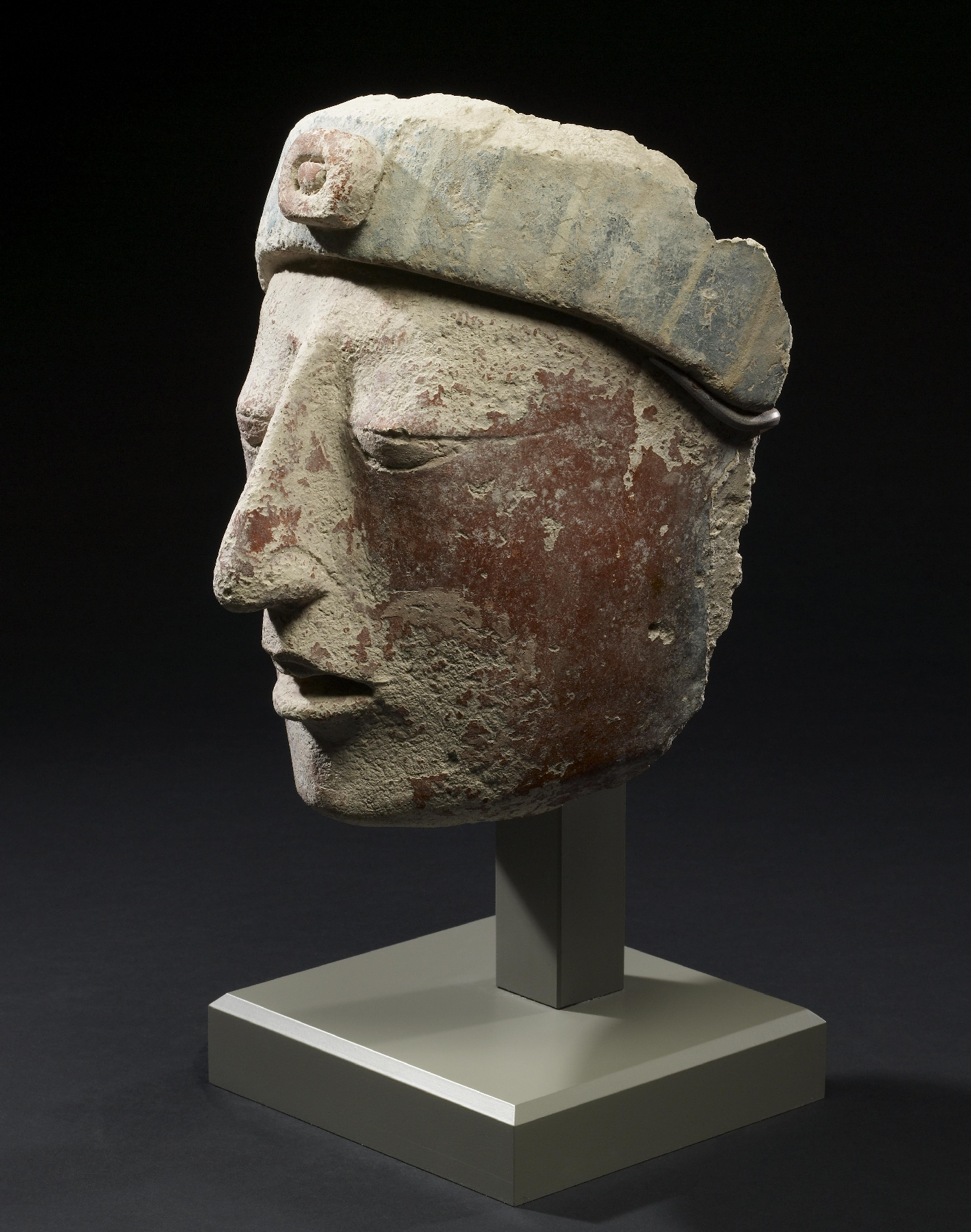
Maya head in stucco, AD 550–850

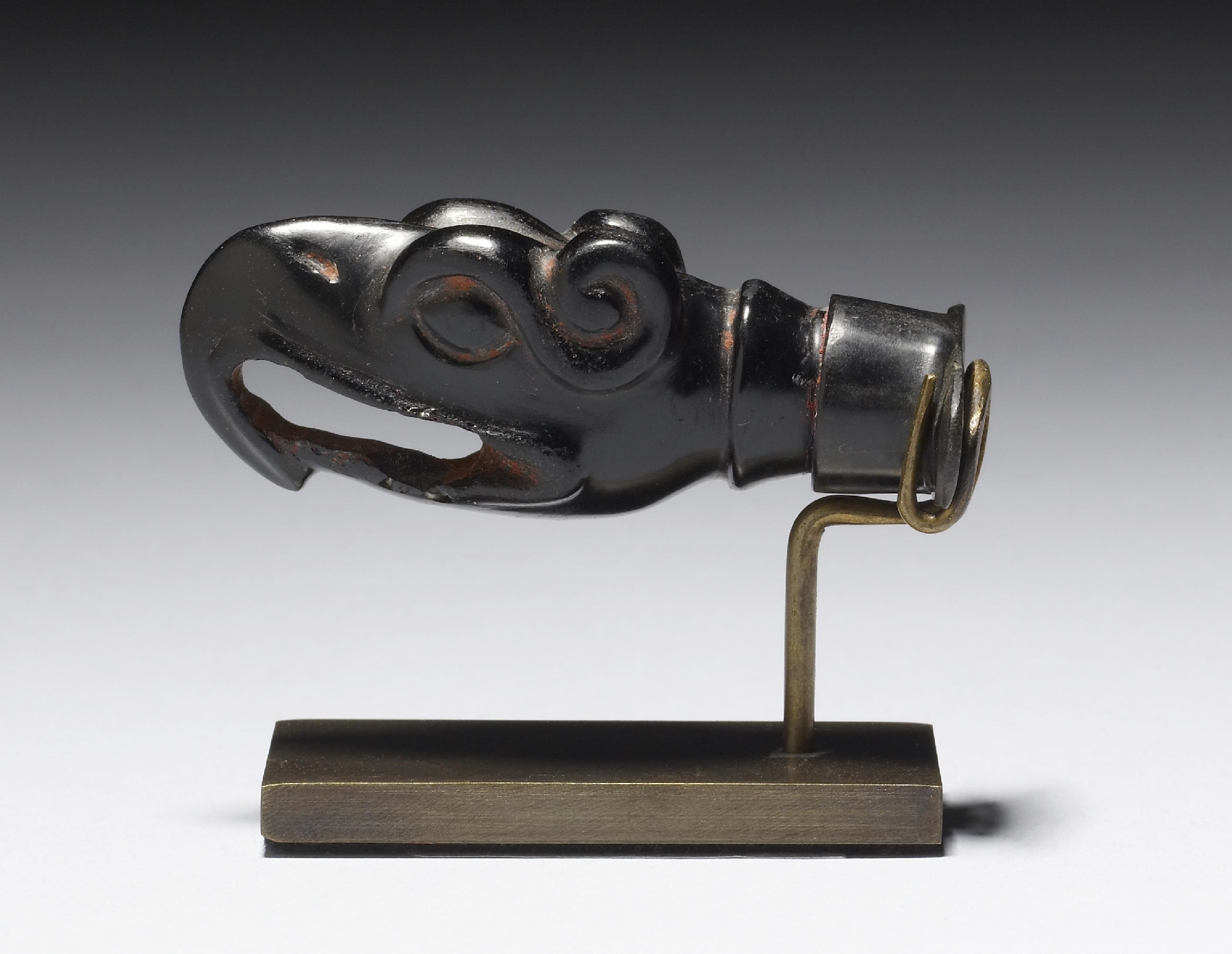
Mixteca-Puebla style labret, obsidian

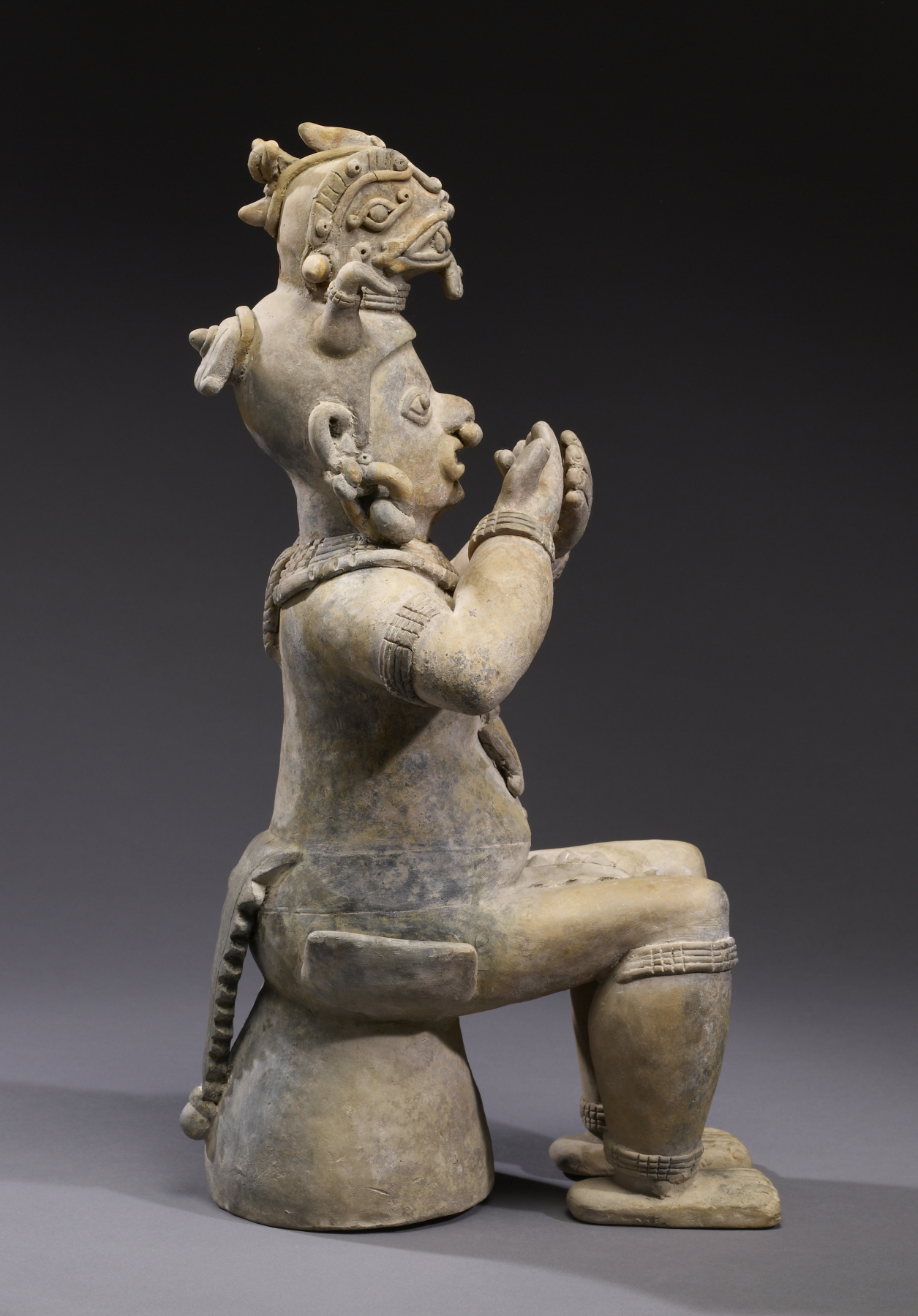
Jama Coaque figure, from Manabí Province, Ecuador, c. 300 BC – AD 800

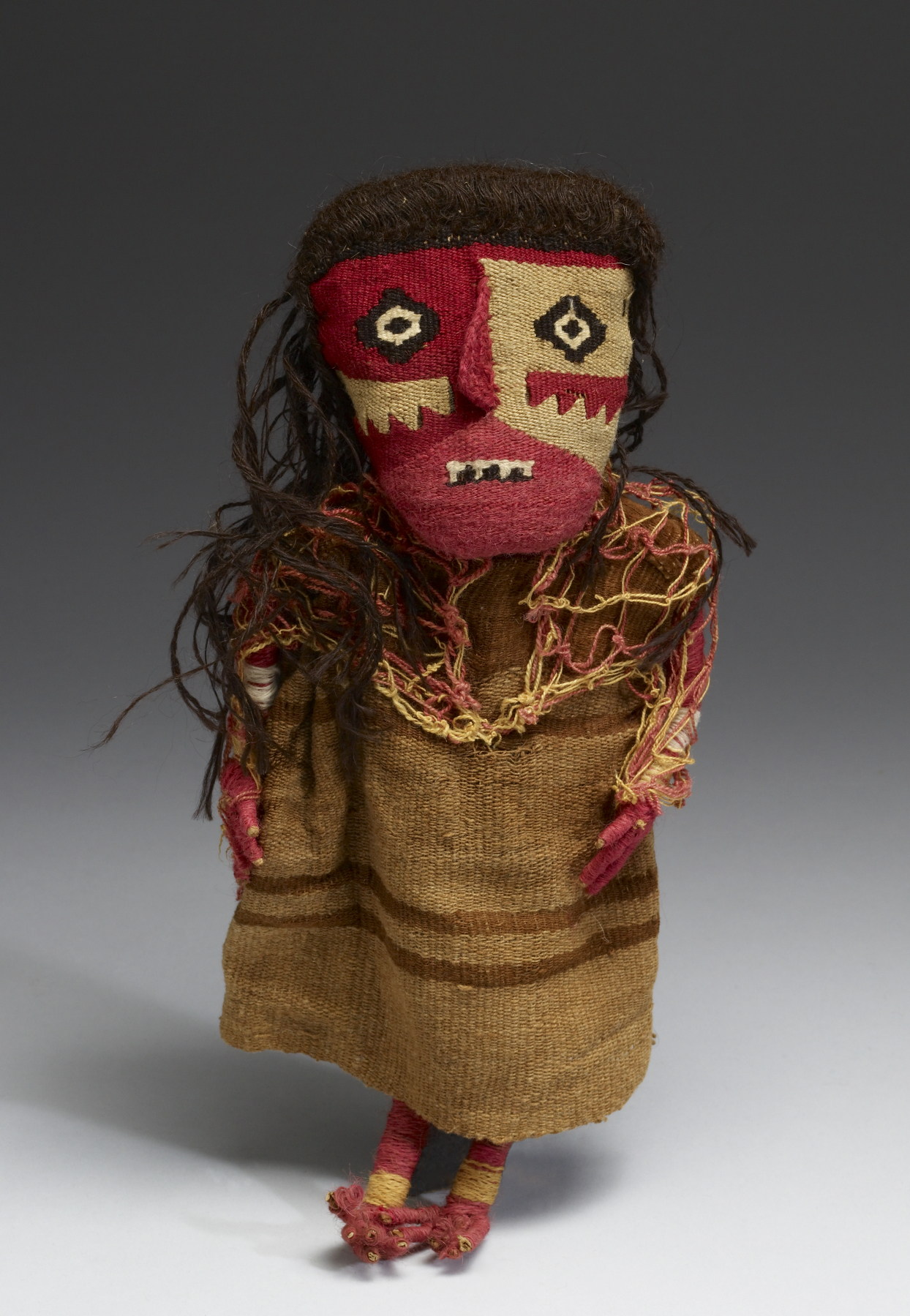
11th-century doll

=== Asian art ===
Highlights of the Asian art collection assembled earlier by Baltimorean father and son collectors William T. and Henry Walters include Japanese arms and armor, and Chinese and Japanese porcelains, lacquers, and metalwork. Among the museum's outstanding works of Asian art is a late-12th- or early-13th-century Cambodian bronze of the eight-armed Avalokiteshvara, a Tang dynasty earthenware camel, and an intricately painted Ming dynasty wine jar. The museum owns the oldest surviving Chinese wood-and-lacquer image of the Buddha (late 6th century AD). It is exhibited in a gallery dedicated solely to this work.

The museum holds one of the largest and finest collections of Thai (Siam/Thailand) bronze, scrolls, and banner paintings in the world.

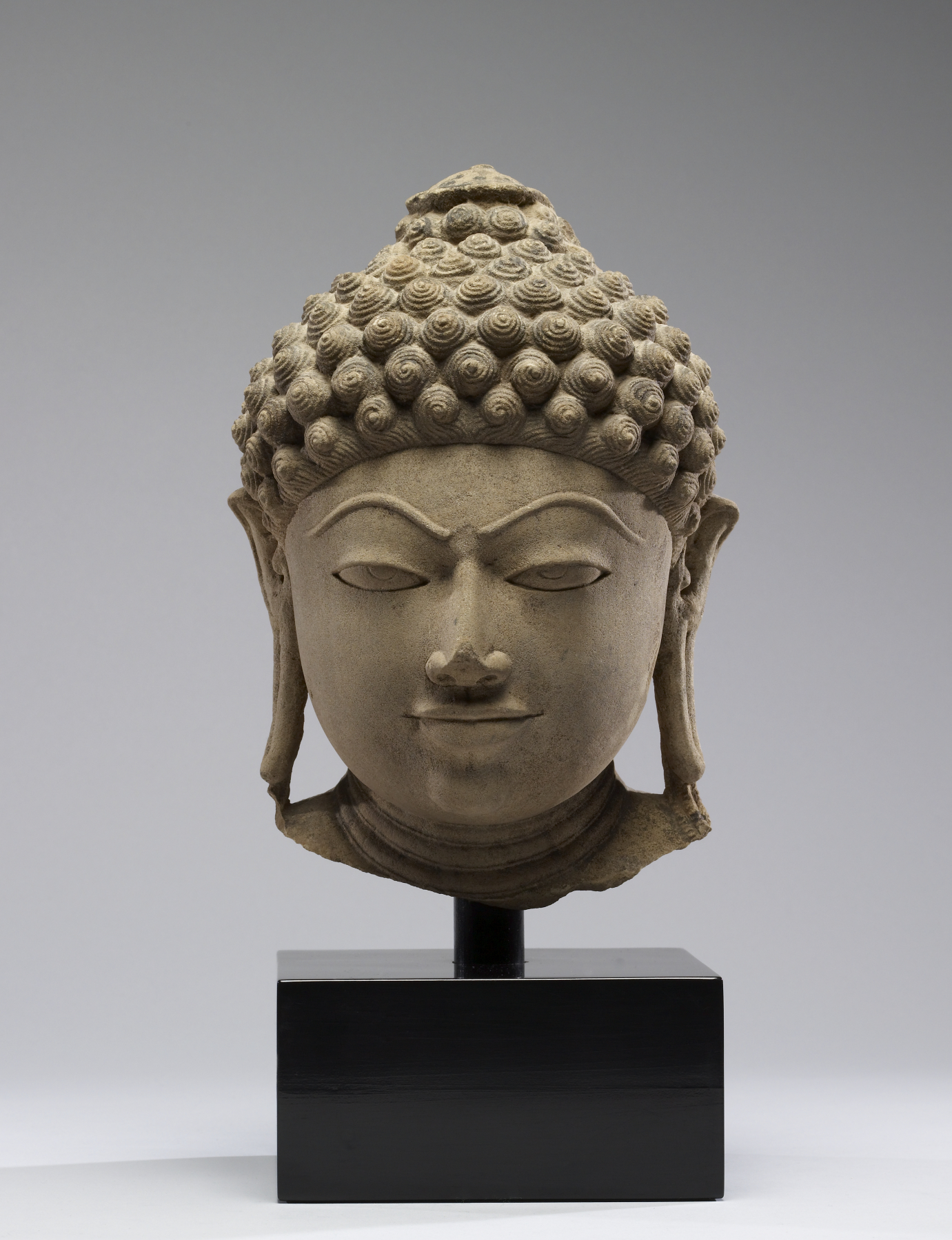
Head of a Jain Tirthankara, India, 10th century

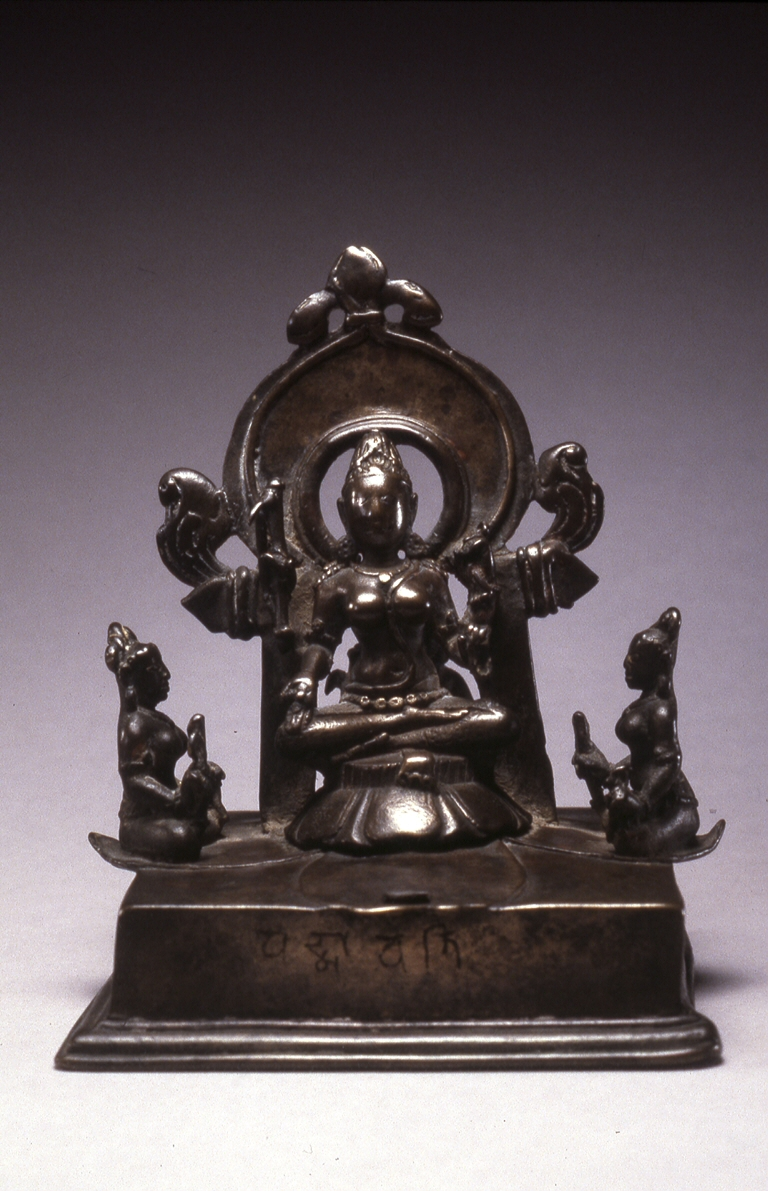
'Mandala of Padmavati' – bronze statue of Goddess Padmavati, India, 11th century

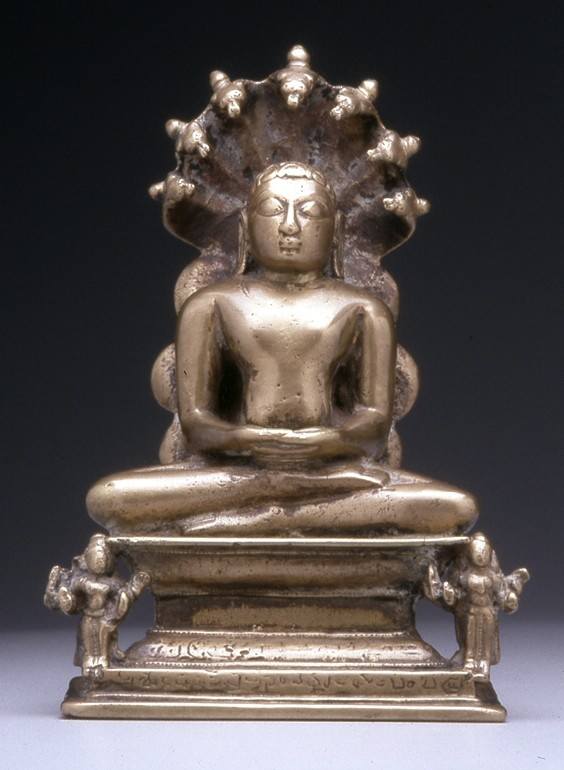
Brass idol of tirthankar Parshvanatha, India, 16th century

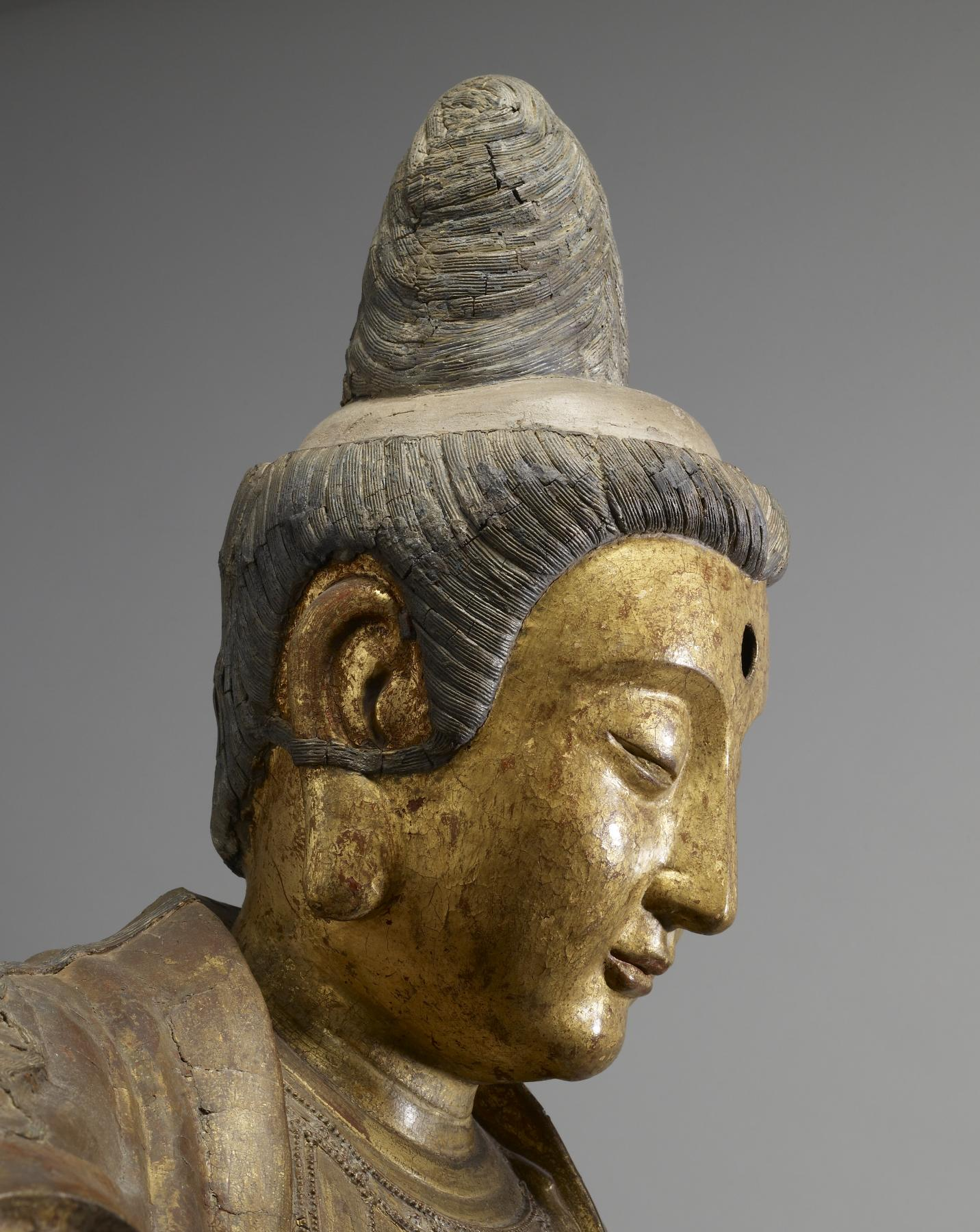
Detail of Ming dynasty wood and lacquer Guanyin

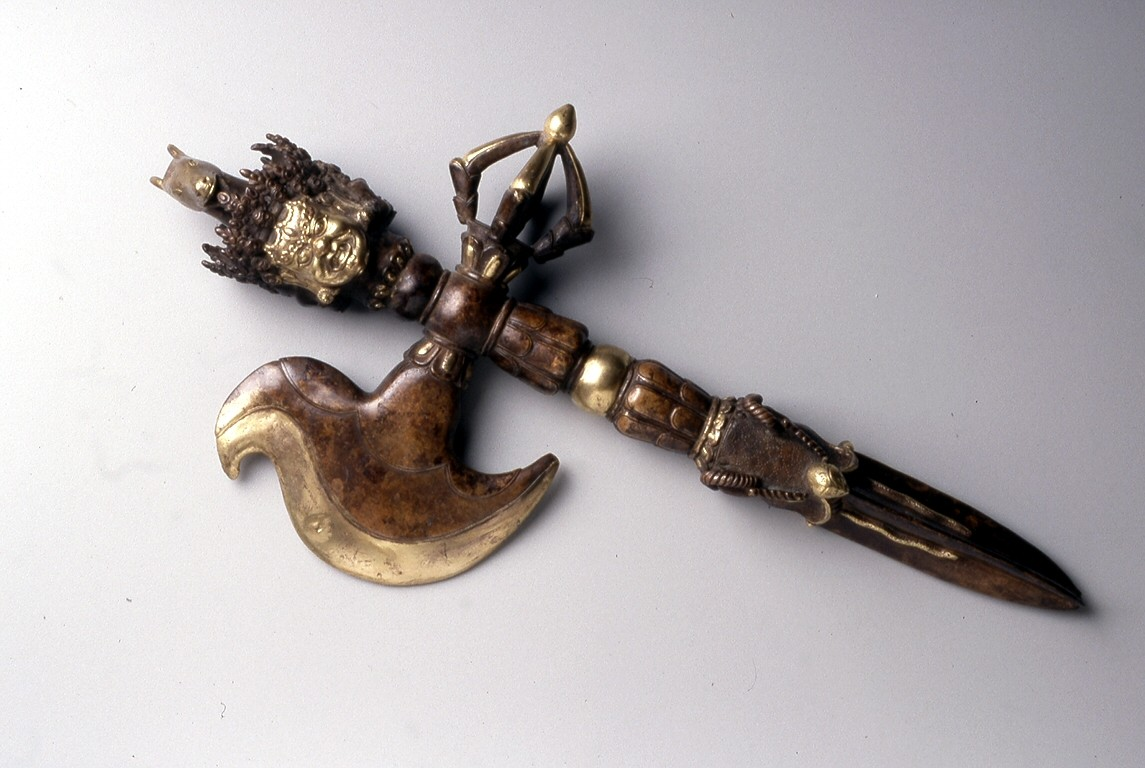
15th-century Tibet, a ritual knife and chopper

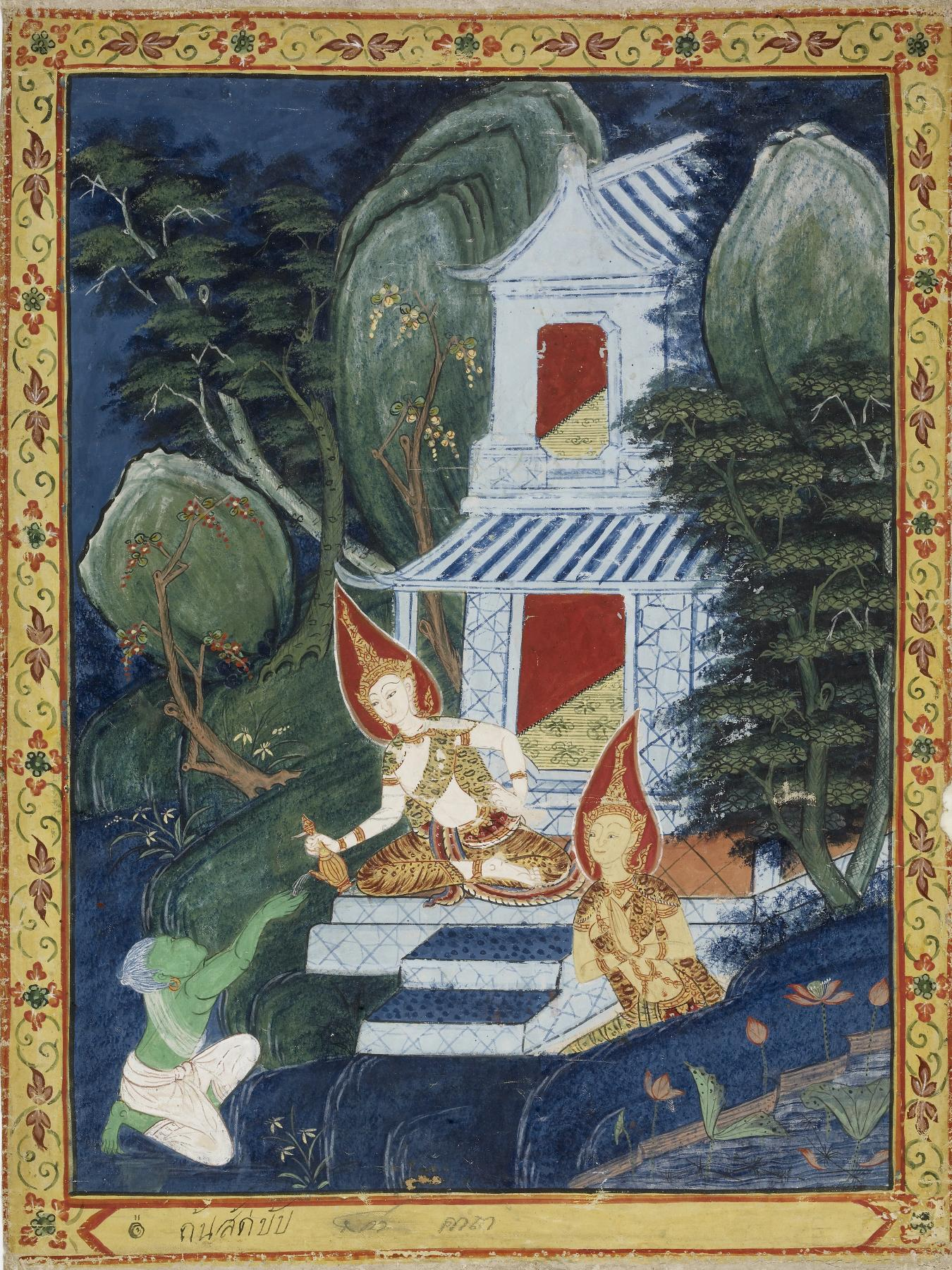
19th-century Thai illustration of Vessantara Jataka, Ch 10

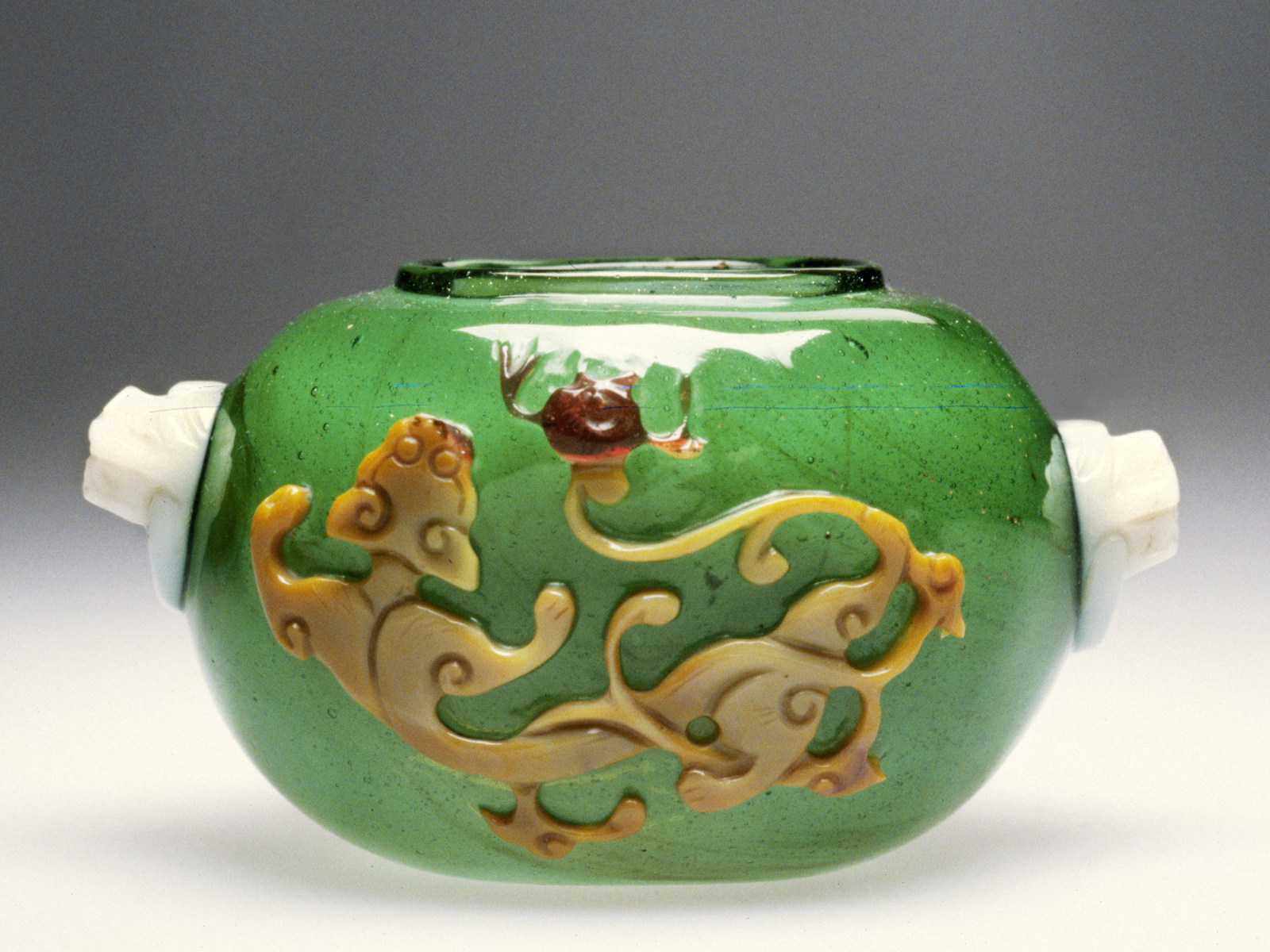
18th-century Chinese jar with dragon

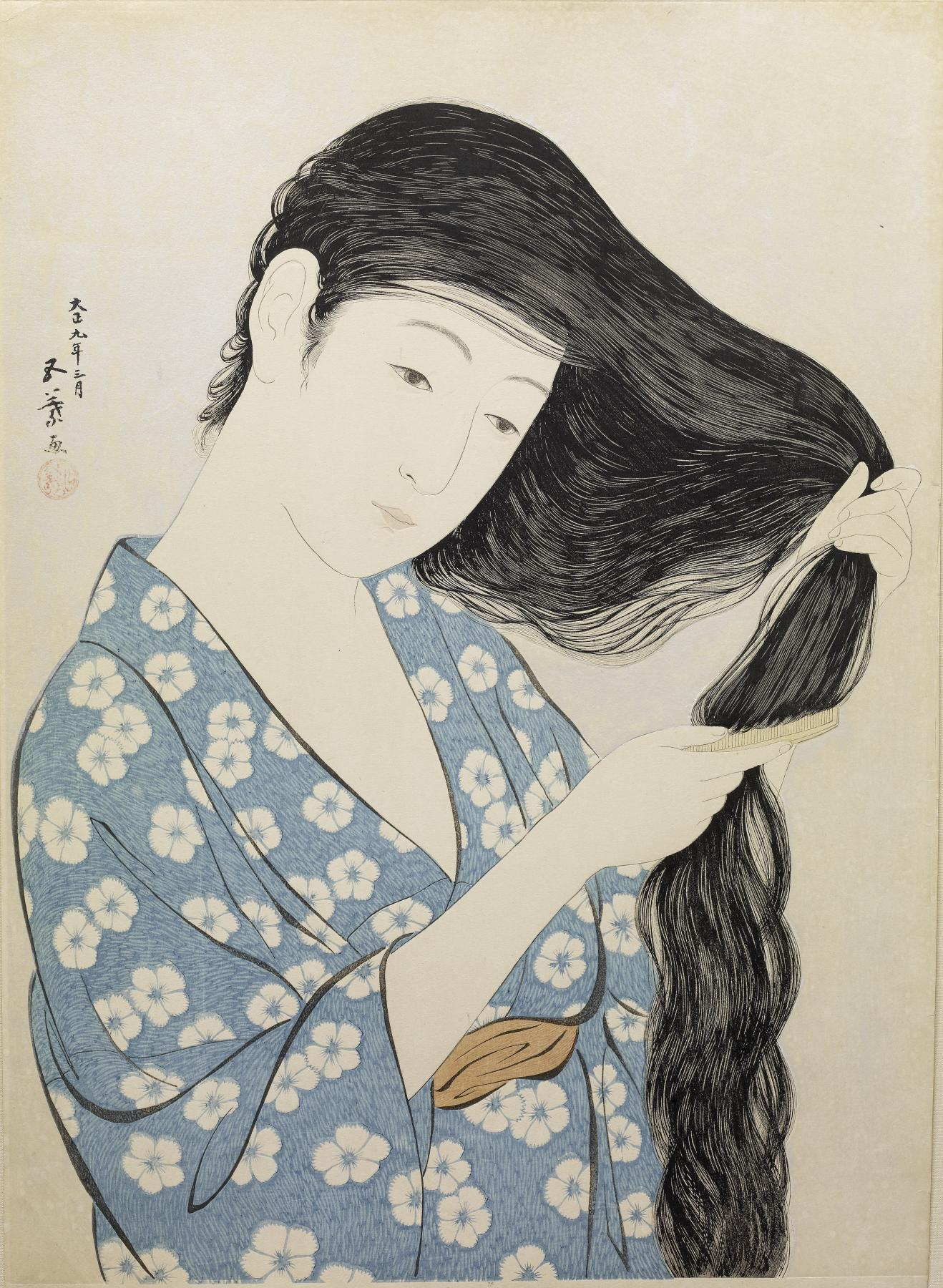
Hashiguchi Goyo, Woman in Blue Combing Her Hair, woodblock print, Japan, 1920

=== Islamic art ===
Islamic art in all media is represented at the Walters. Among the highlights are a 7th-century carved and hammered silver bowl from Iran, (ancient Persia); a 13th-century candlestick made of copper, silver, and gold from the Mamluk era in Egypt; 16th-century mausoleum doors decorated with intricate wood carvings in a radiating star pattern; a 17th-century silk sash from the Mughal Empire in India; and a 17th-century Turkish tile with an image of the Masjid al-Haram ("Great Mosque of Mecca"), the center of Islam in Mecca, (modern Saudi Arabia). The Walters Museum owns an array of Islamic manuscripts. These include a 15th-century Koran from northern India, written at the height of the Timurid Empire; a 16th-century copy of the "Khamsa of Nizami by Amir Khusraw, illustrated by a number of famous artists for the Emperor Akbar; and a Turkish calligraphy album by Sheikh Hamadullah Al-Amasi, one of the greatest calligraphers of all time. Walters Art Museum, MS W.613 contains five Mughal miniatures from an important "Khamsa of Nizami" made for the Emperor Akbar; the rest are in London, Great Britain.

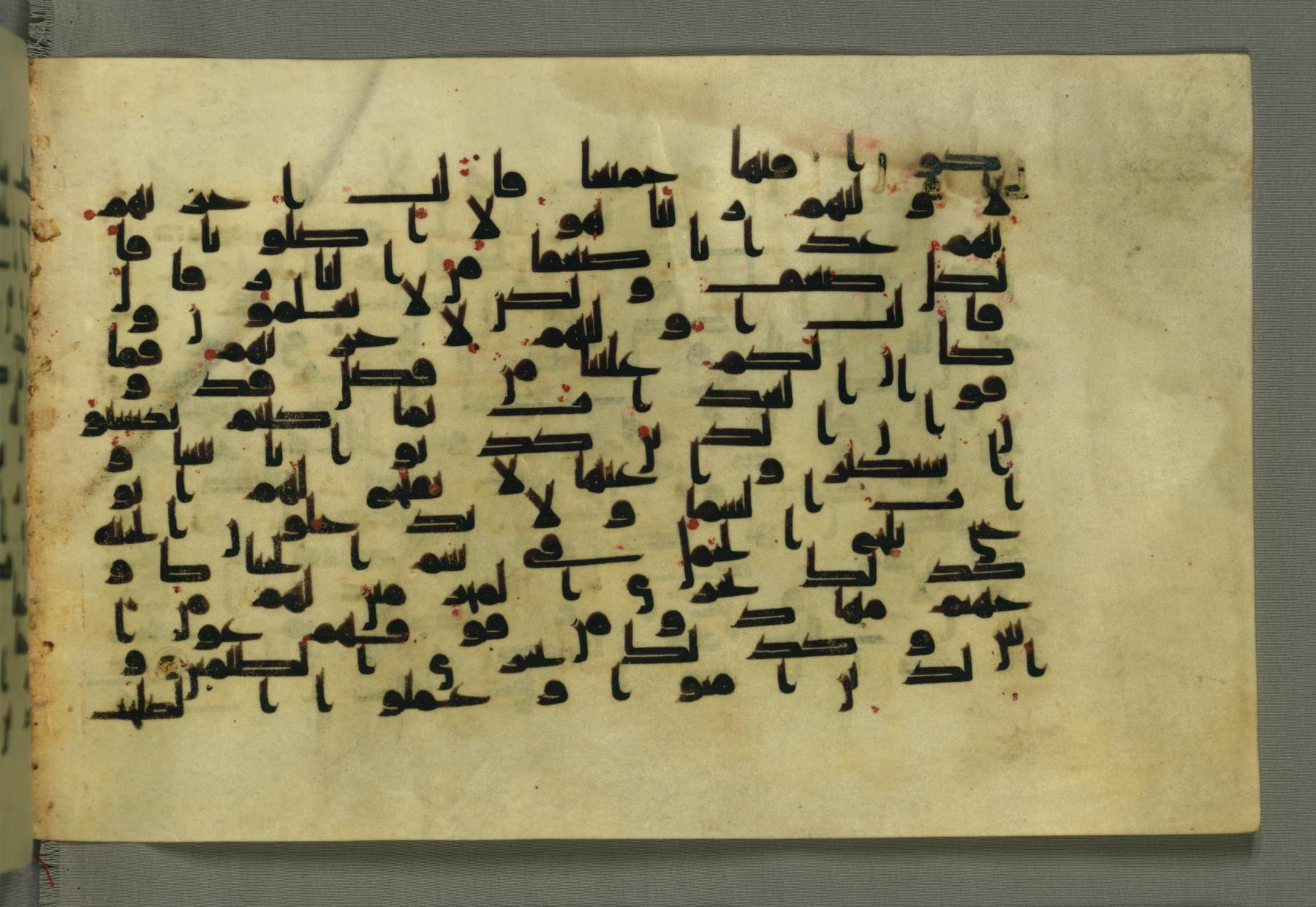
Early Qur'an page in Kufic script, 9th century

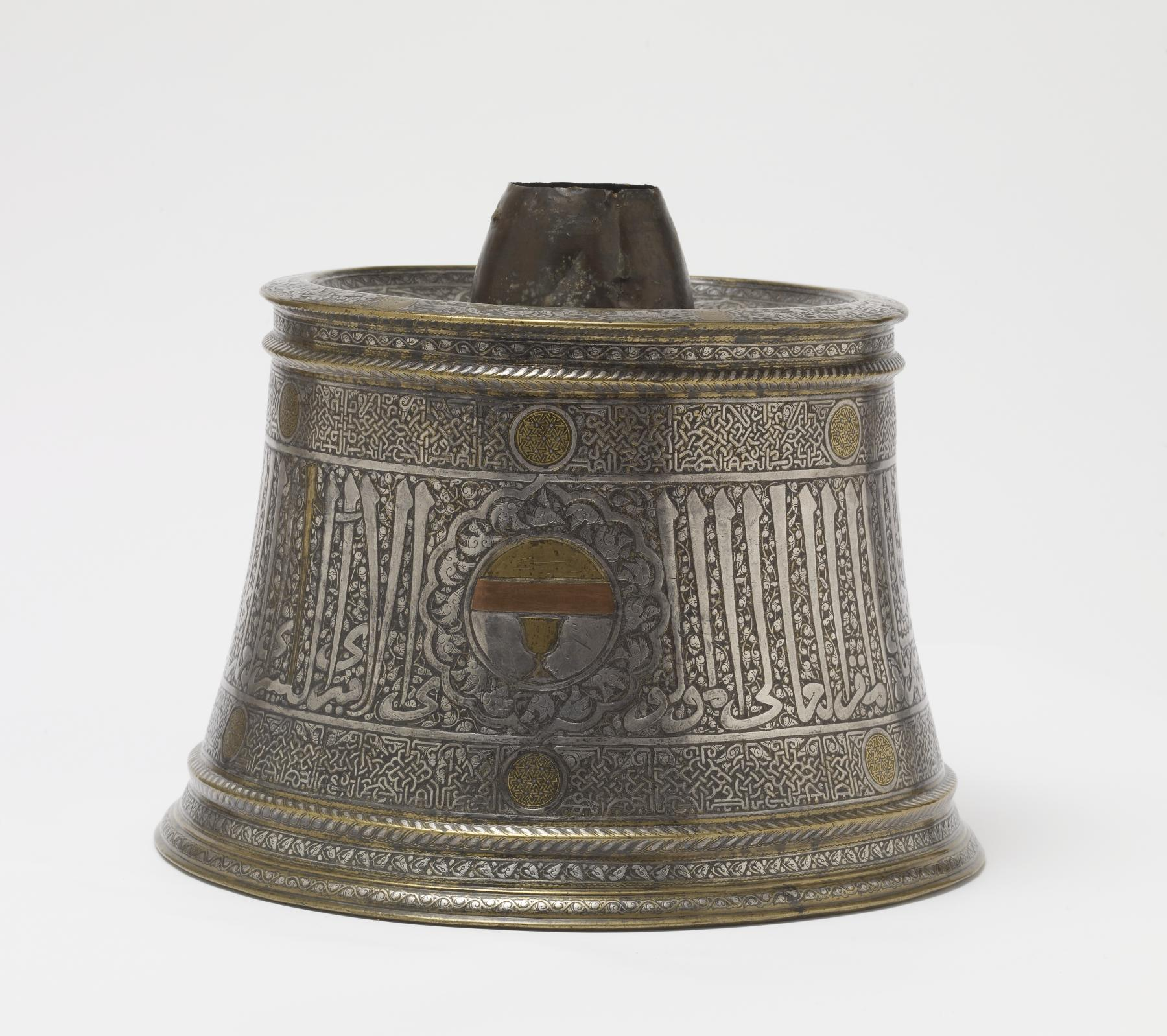
Mamluk-era in Egypt candlestick base, c1240, brass with silver, gold and copper inlays

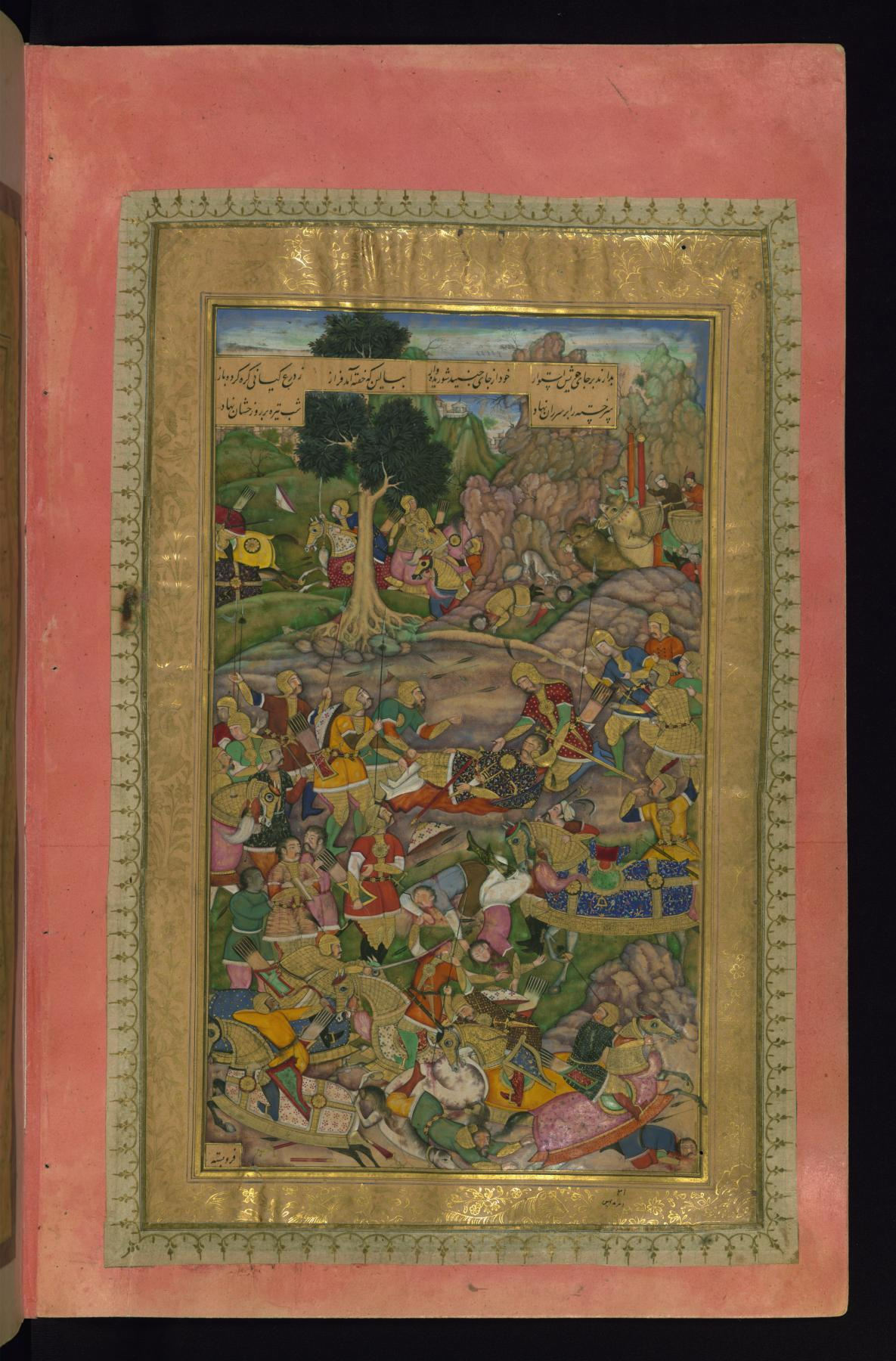
The Death of Darius, Mughal miniature from Akbar's Khamsa of Nizami, 1595, MS W.613

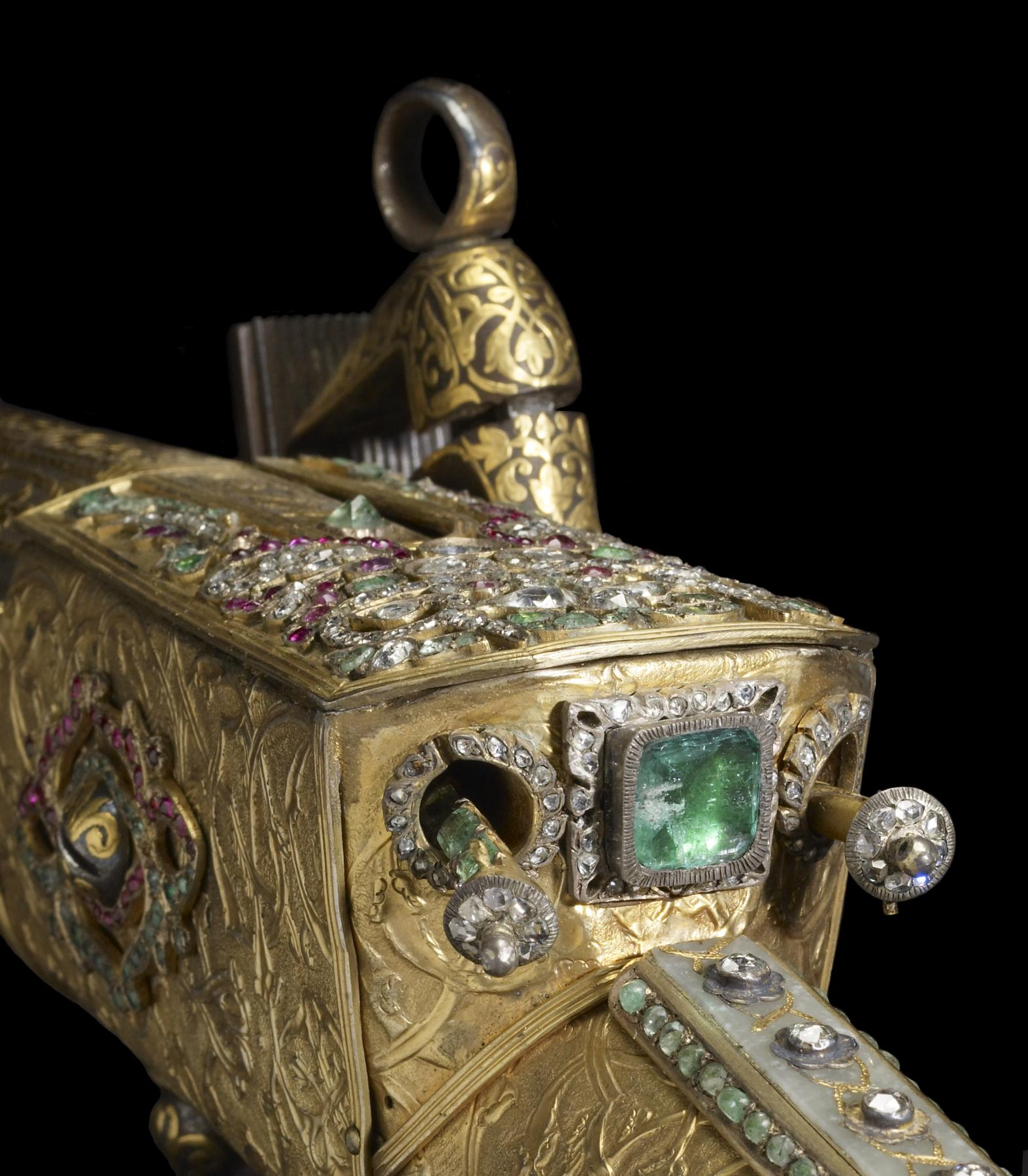
Detail of an 18th-century ceremonial jeweled Turkish rifle

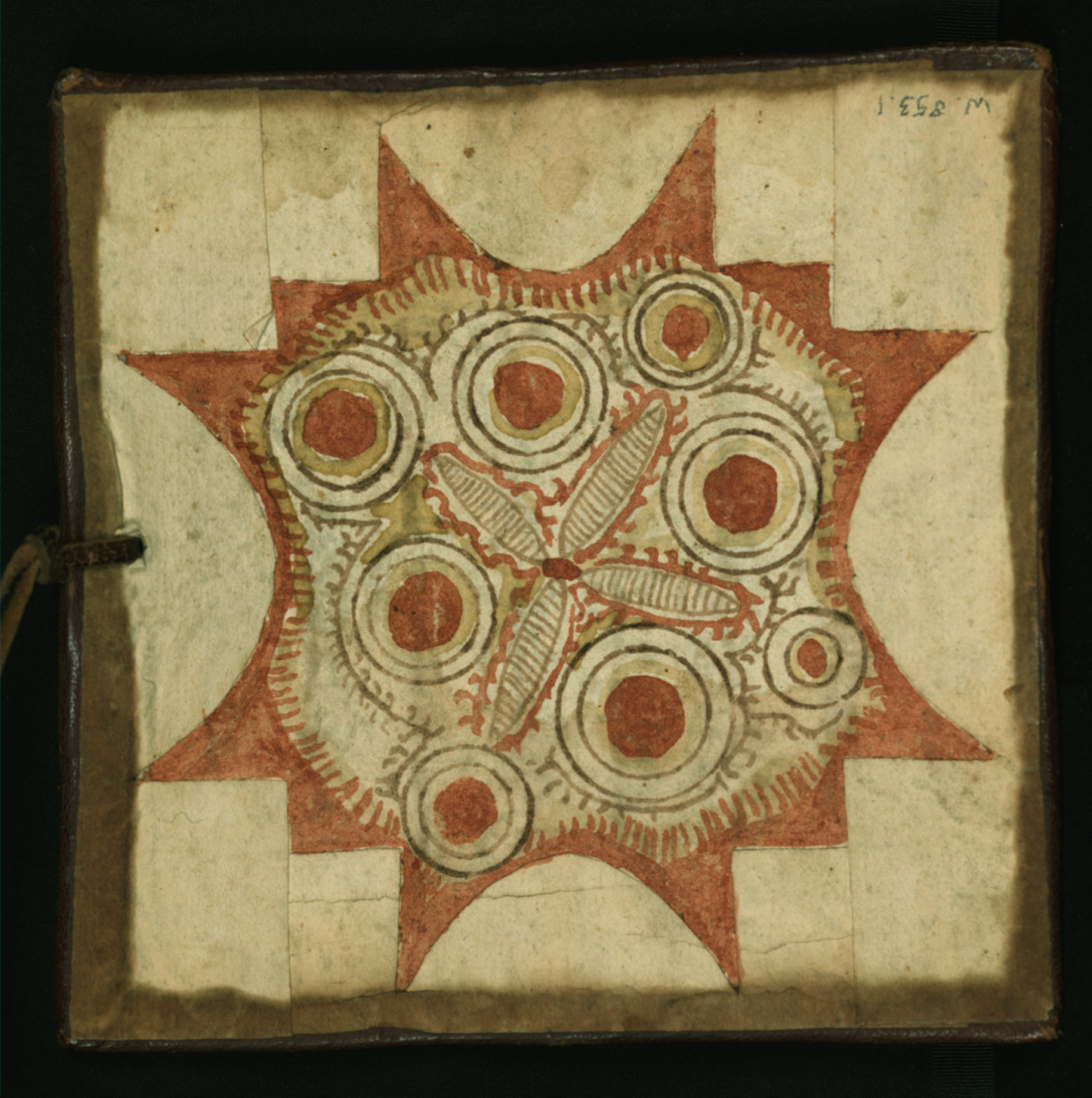
Inside of Qur'an cover, 19th century, sub-Saharan Africa

=== Medieval European art ===
Henry Walters assembled a collection of art produced during the Middle Ages in all the major artistic media of the period. This forms the basis of the Walters' medieval collection, for which the museum is best known internationally. Considered one of the best collections of medieval art in the United States, the museum's holdings include examples of metalwork, sculpture, stained glass, textiles, icons, and other paintings. The collection is especially renowned for its ivories, enamels, reliquaries, early Byzantine silver, post-Byzantine art, illuminated manuscripts, Georgian illuminated Gospel manuscript, and the largest and finest collection of Ethiopian Orthodox Church art outside Ethiopia.

The Walters' medieval collection features unique objects such as the Byzantine agate Rubens Vase that belonged to the painter Rubens (accession no. 42.562) and the earliest-surviving image of the "Virgin of Tenderness", an ivory carving produced in Egypt in the 6th or 7th century (accession no. 71.297). Sculpted heads from the royal Abbey of St. Denis are rare surviving examples of portal sculptures that are directly connected with the origins of Gothic art in 12th-century France (accession nos. 27.21 and 27.22). An ivory casket covered with scenes of jousting knights is one of about a dozen such objects to survive in the world (accession no. 71.264).

Many of these works are on display in the museum's galleries. Works from the medieval collection are also frequently included in special touring exhibitions, such as Treasures of Heaven, an exhibition about relics and reliquaries that was on view at the Cleveland Museum of Art in (Cleveland, Ohio), the Walters Art Museum, and the British Museum in London in 2010–11.

Works in the medieval collection are the subject of active research by the curatorial and conservation departments of the museum, and visiting researchers frequently make use of the museum's holdings. In-depth technical research carried on these objects is made available to the public through publications and exhibitions, as in the case of the Amandus Shrine (accession no. 53.9), which was featured in a small special exhibition titled The Special Dead in 2008–09.

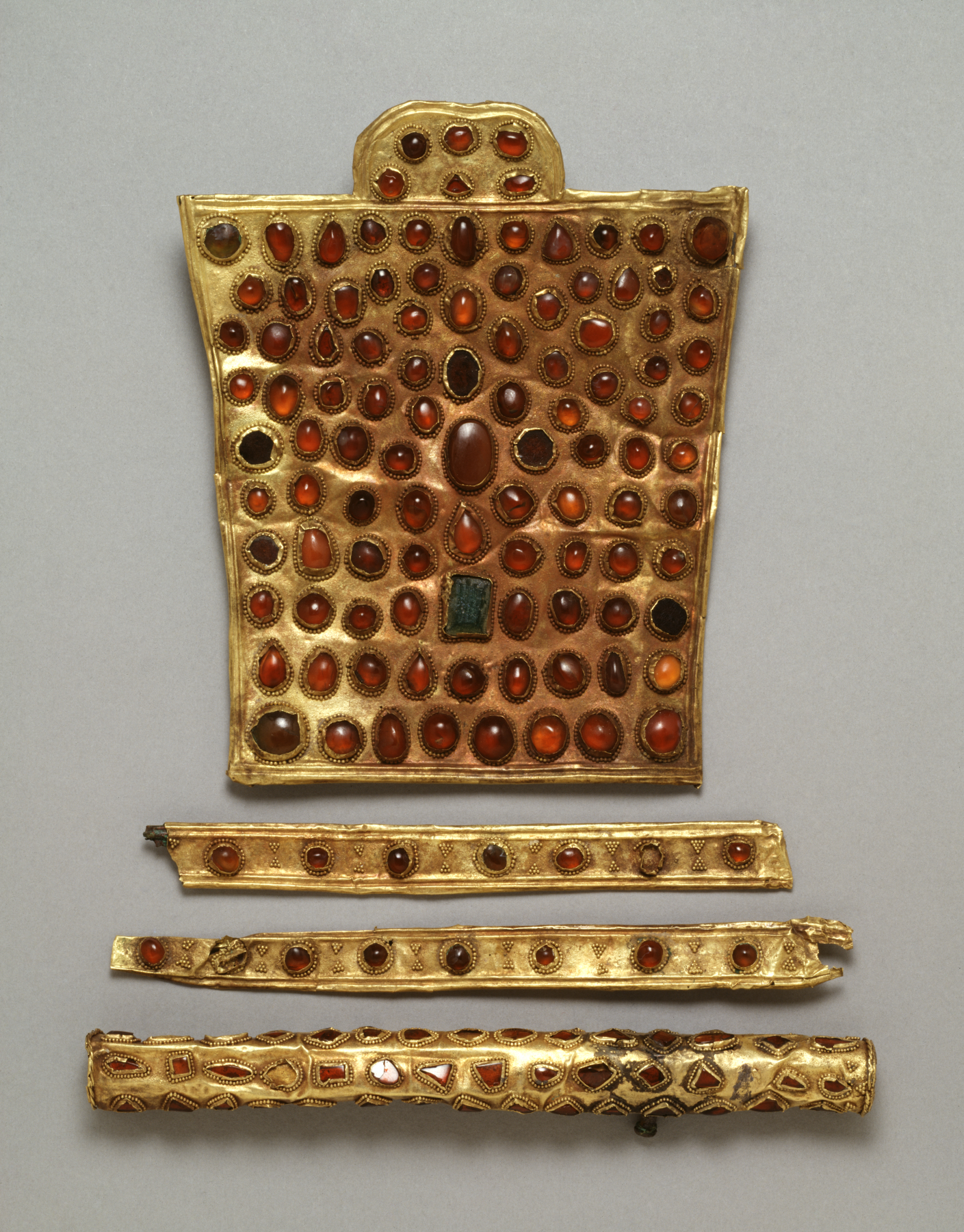
Hunnish set of horse trappings, 4th century

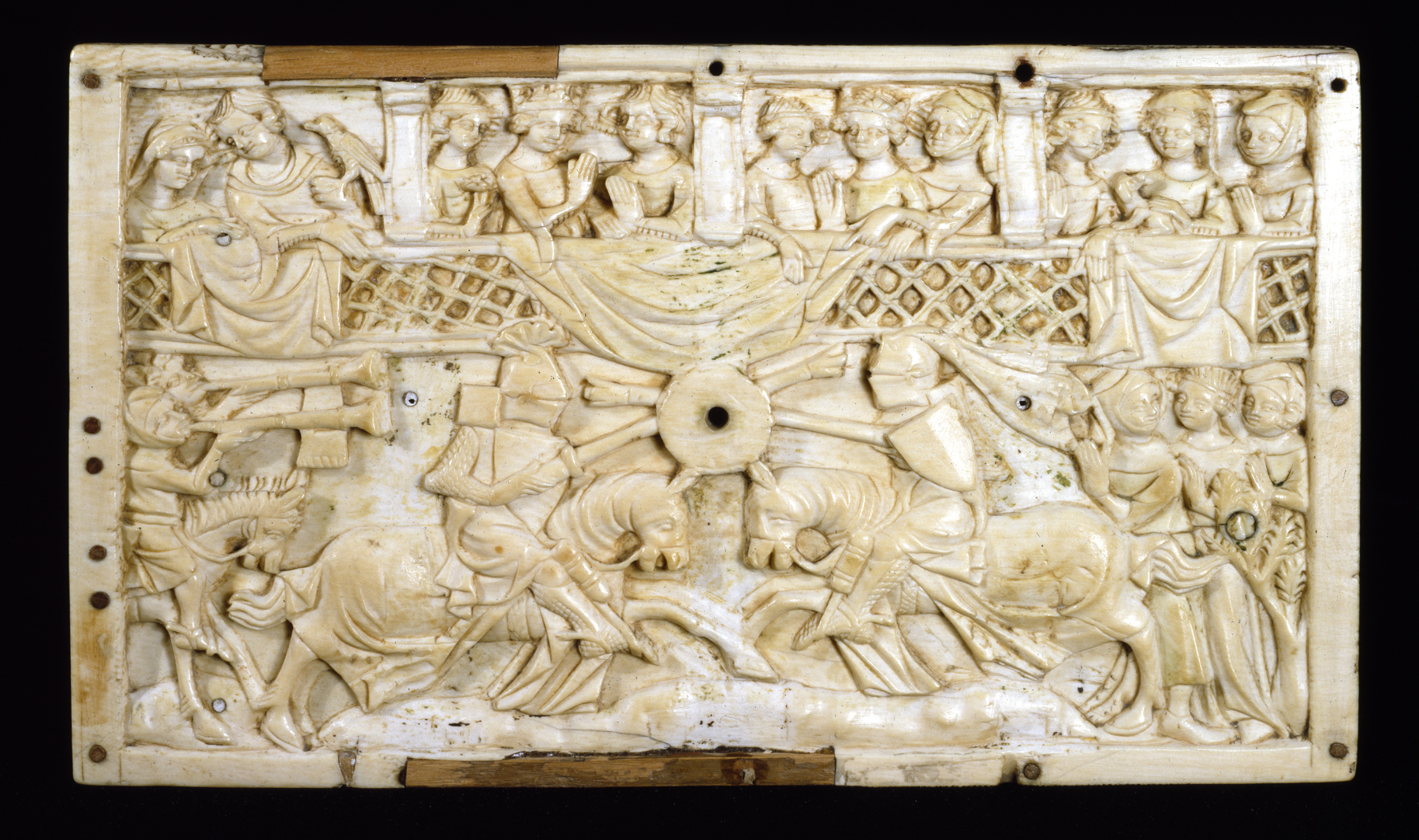
French Gothic ivory Box Lid with a Tournament, 14th century (Walters 71274)

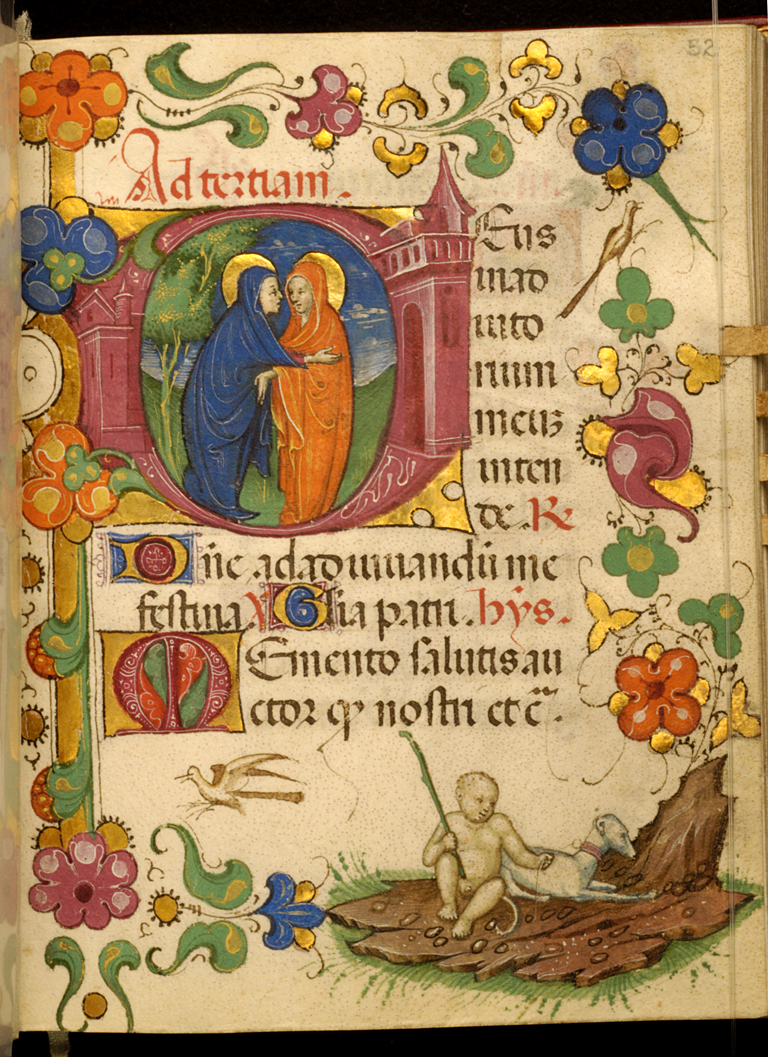
Leaf from Barbavara Book of Hours, Milan c. 1440

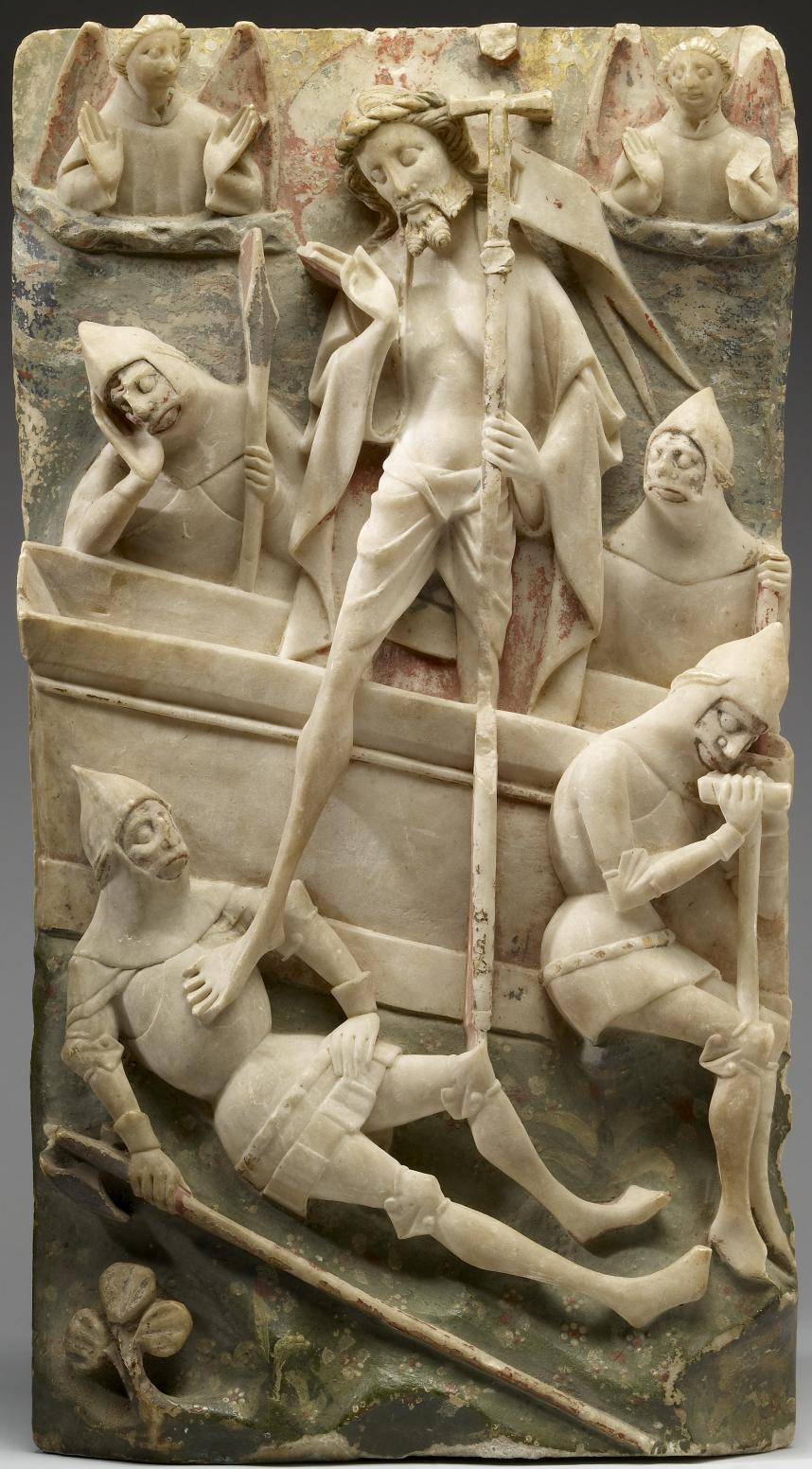
15th century Nottingham alabaster panel of the Resurrection of Christ

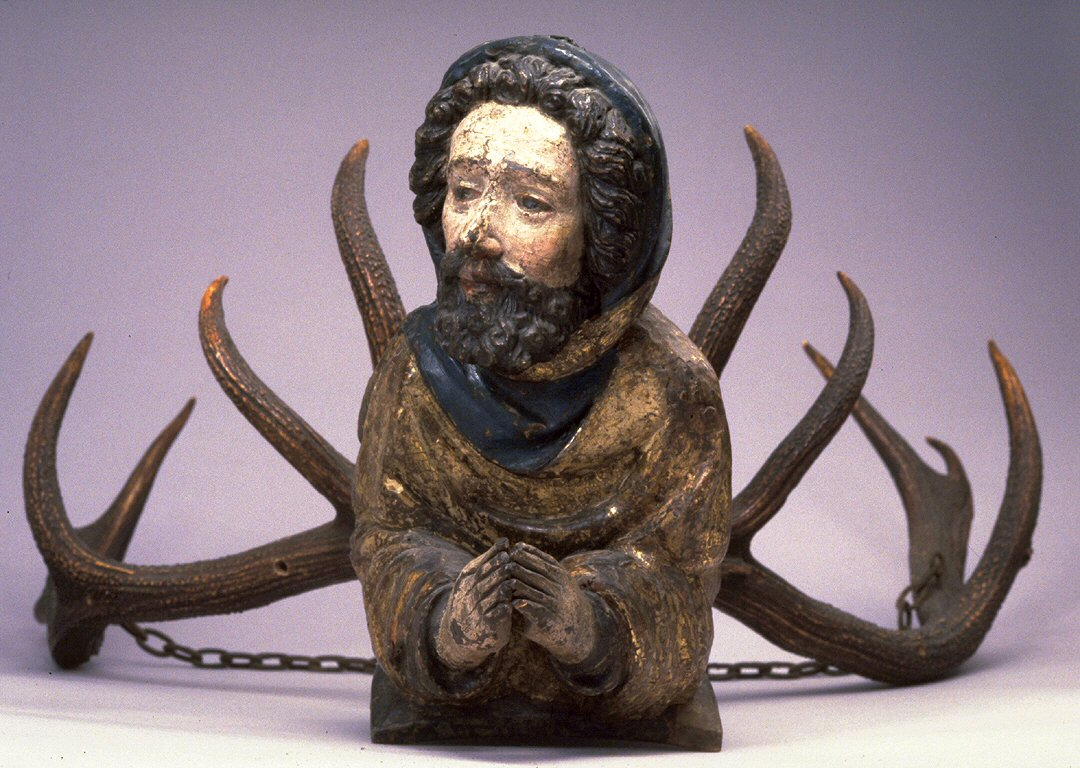
German chandelier, red deer antler and wood, 15th century

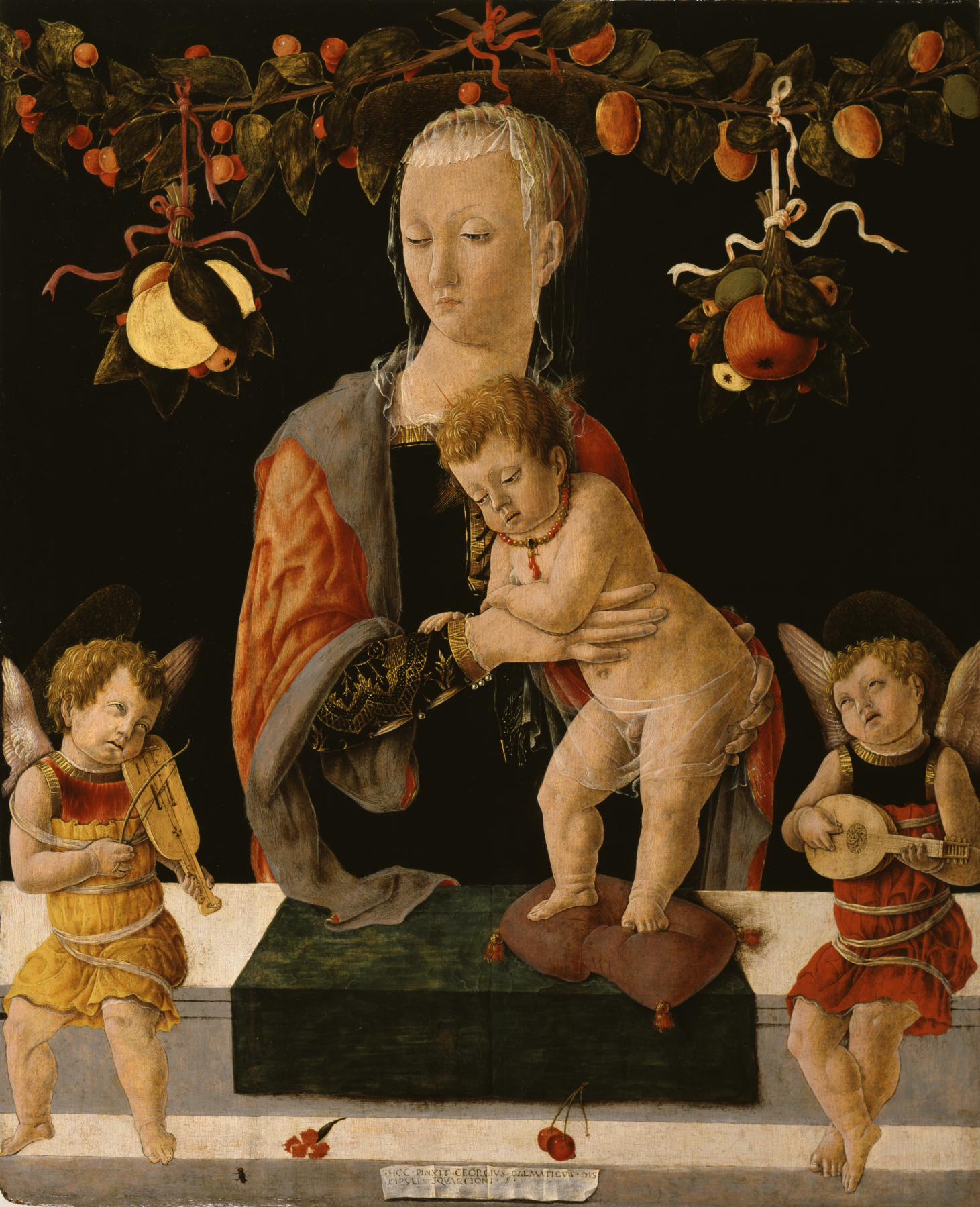
Madonna and Child, c. 1459–1460, Giorgio Schiavone

There are also Late Medieval devotional Italian paintings by these painters at the Walters: Tommaso da Modena, Pietro Lorenzetti, Andrea di Bartolo (Resurrection), Alberto Sotio, Bartolomeo di Tommaso (Death of Saint Francis), Naddo Ceccarelli, Master of Saint Verdiana, Niccolo di Segna (Saint Lucy), Orcagna, Olivuccio di Ciccarello, Master of Panzano Triptych and Giovanni del Biondo.

=== Renaissance, Baroque and 18th-century European art ===
The collection of European Renaissance and Baroque art features holdings of paintings, sculpture, furniture, ceramics, metal work, arms and armor. The highlights include Hugo van der Goes' Donor with Saint John the Baptist, Heemskerck's Panorama with the Abduction of Helen Amidst the Wonders of the Ancient World, El Greco's Saint Francis Receiving the Stigmata, Giambattista Pittoni's Sacrifice of Polyxena, the Madonna of the Candelabra, from the studio of Raphael, Veronese's Portrait Of Countess Livia da Porto Thiene and her Daughter Porzia, El Greco's Saint Francis Receiving the Stigmata, Bernini's "bozzetto" of Risen Christ, Tiepolo's Scipio Africanus Freeing Massiva, and The Ideal City attributed to Fra Carnevale. The museum has one of ten surviving examples of the Sèvres pot-pourri vase in the shape of a ship from the 1750s and 1760s.

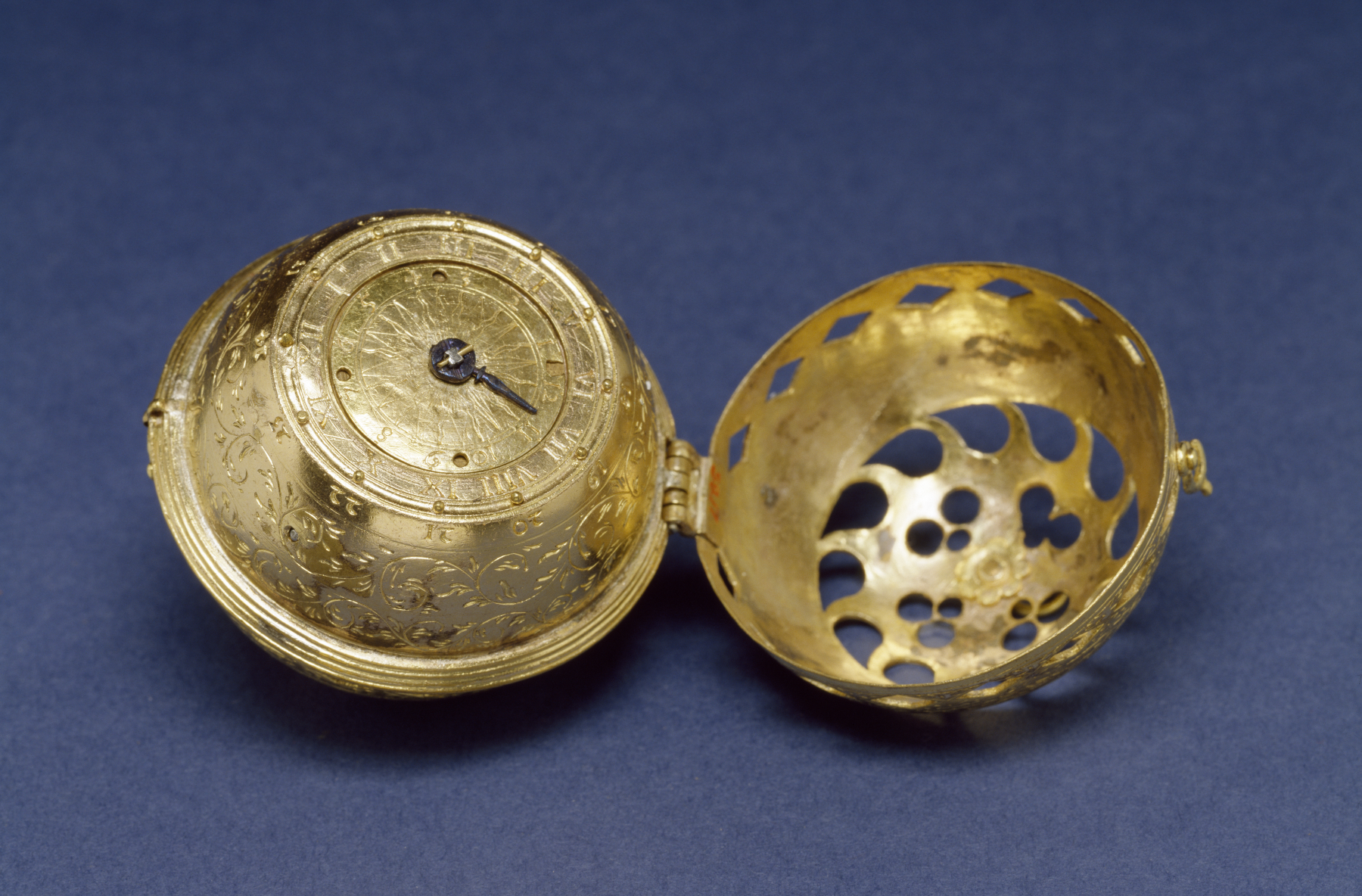
Pomander Watch of 1530, once belonged to Philip Melanchthon, possibly created by Peter Henlein

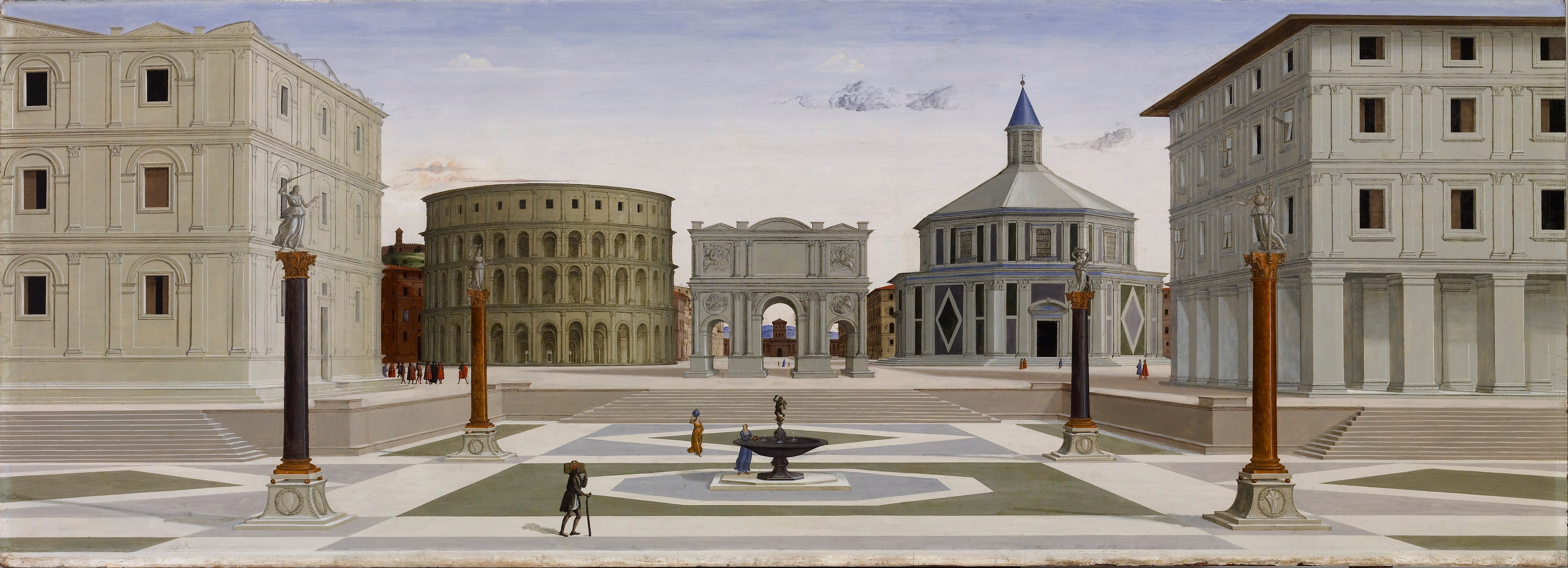
The Ideal City (c. 1480–1484) attributed to Fra Carnevale

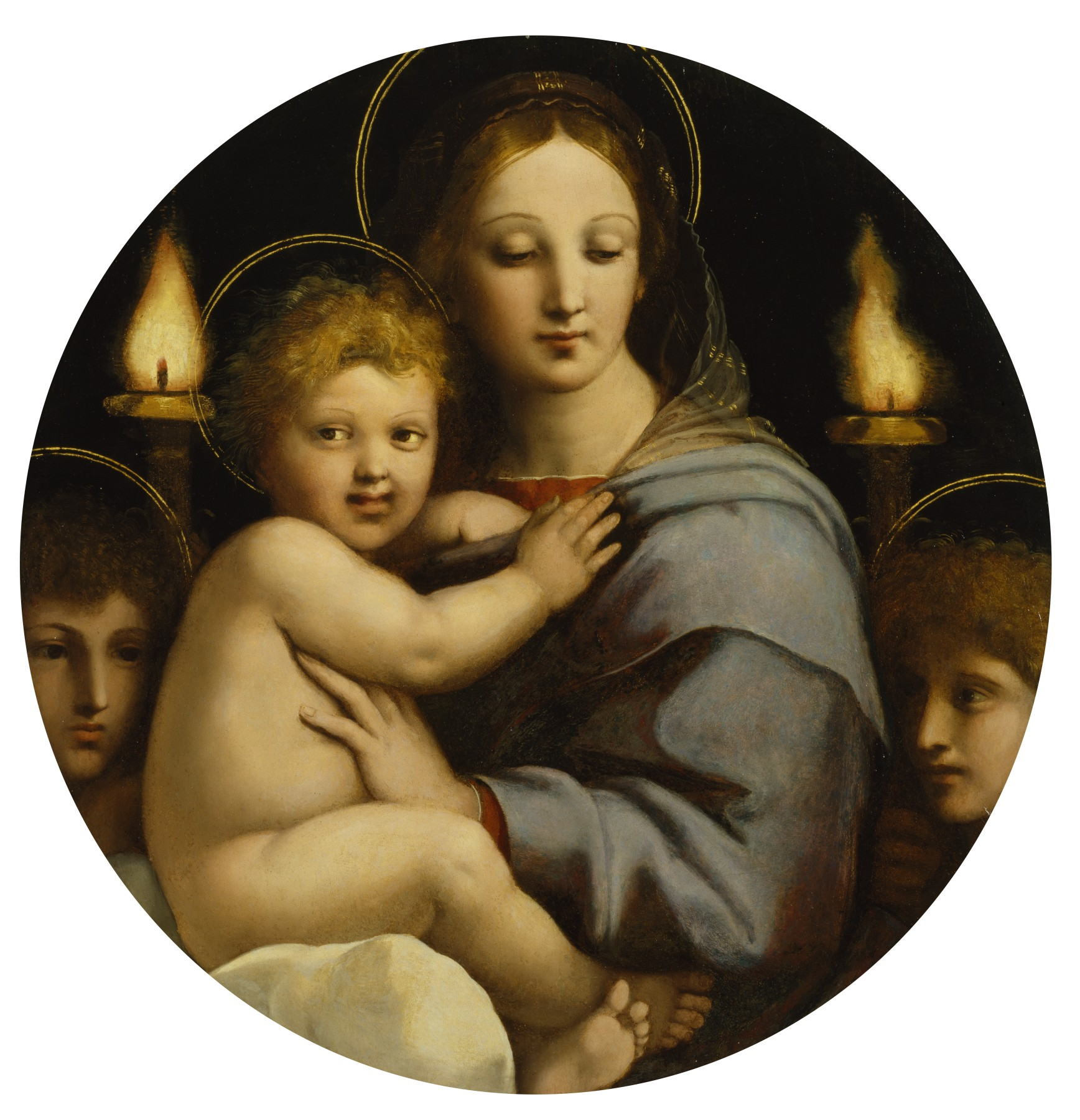
Madonna of the Candelabra (c. 1513) by Raphael.

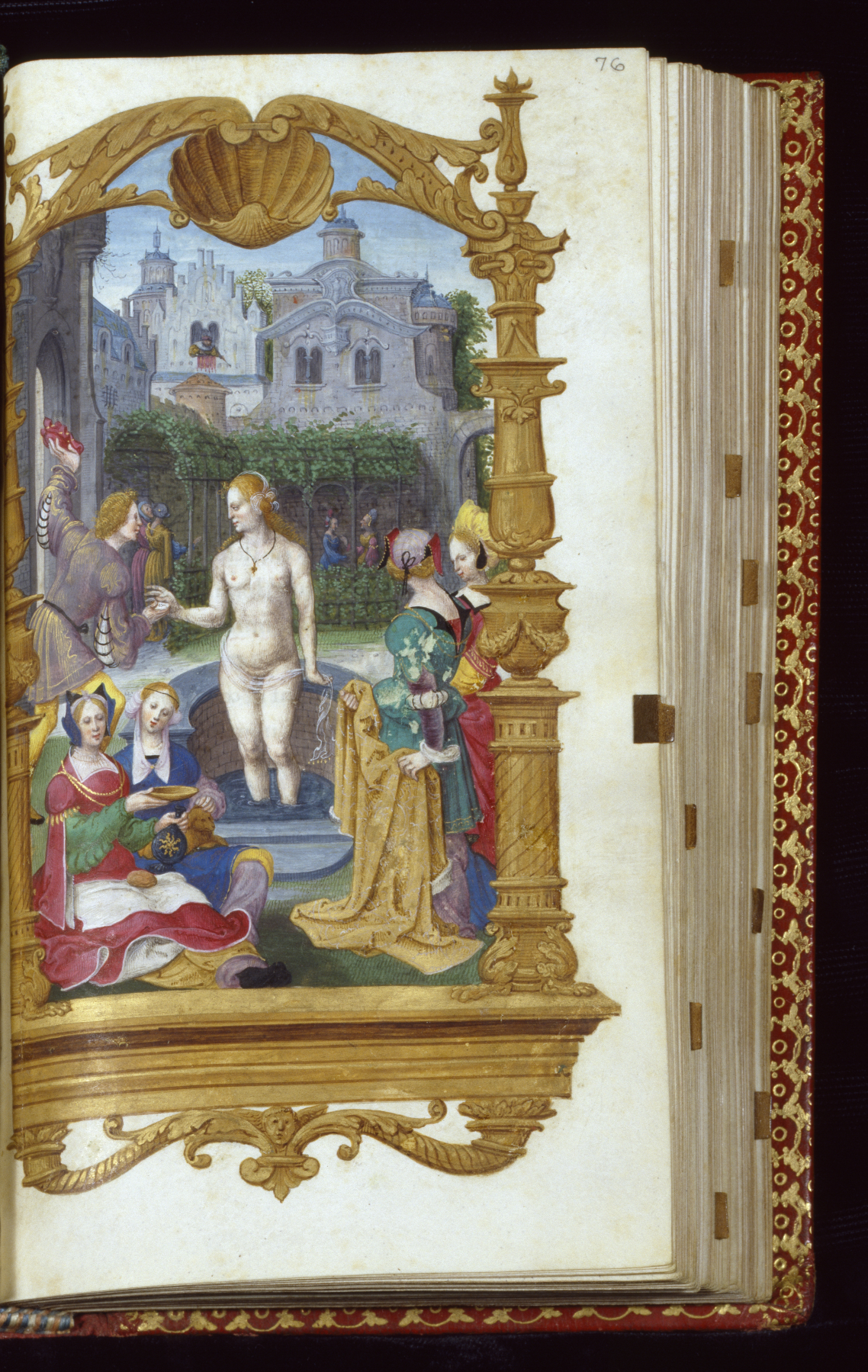
Leaf from Book of Hours, French Renaissance, 1524

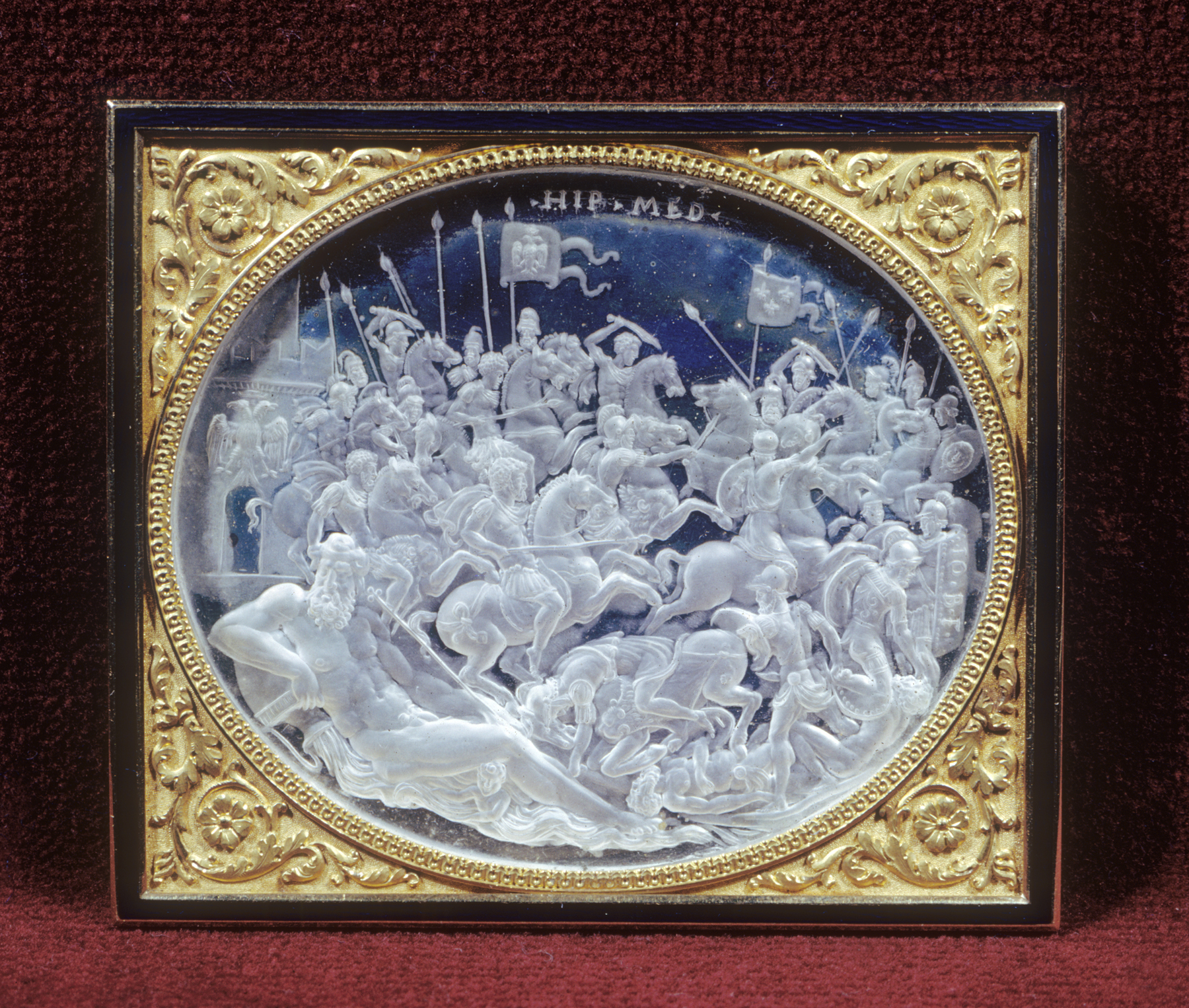
The Battle of Pavia, engraved on rock crystal for a Medici Cardinal by Giovanni Bernardi, 1530s

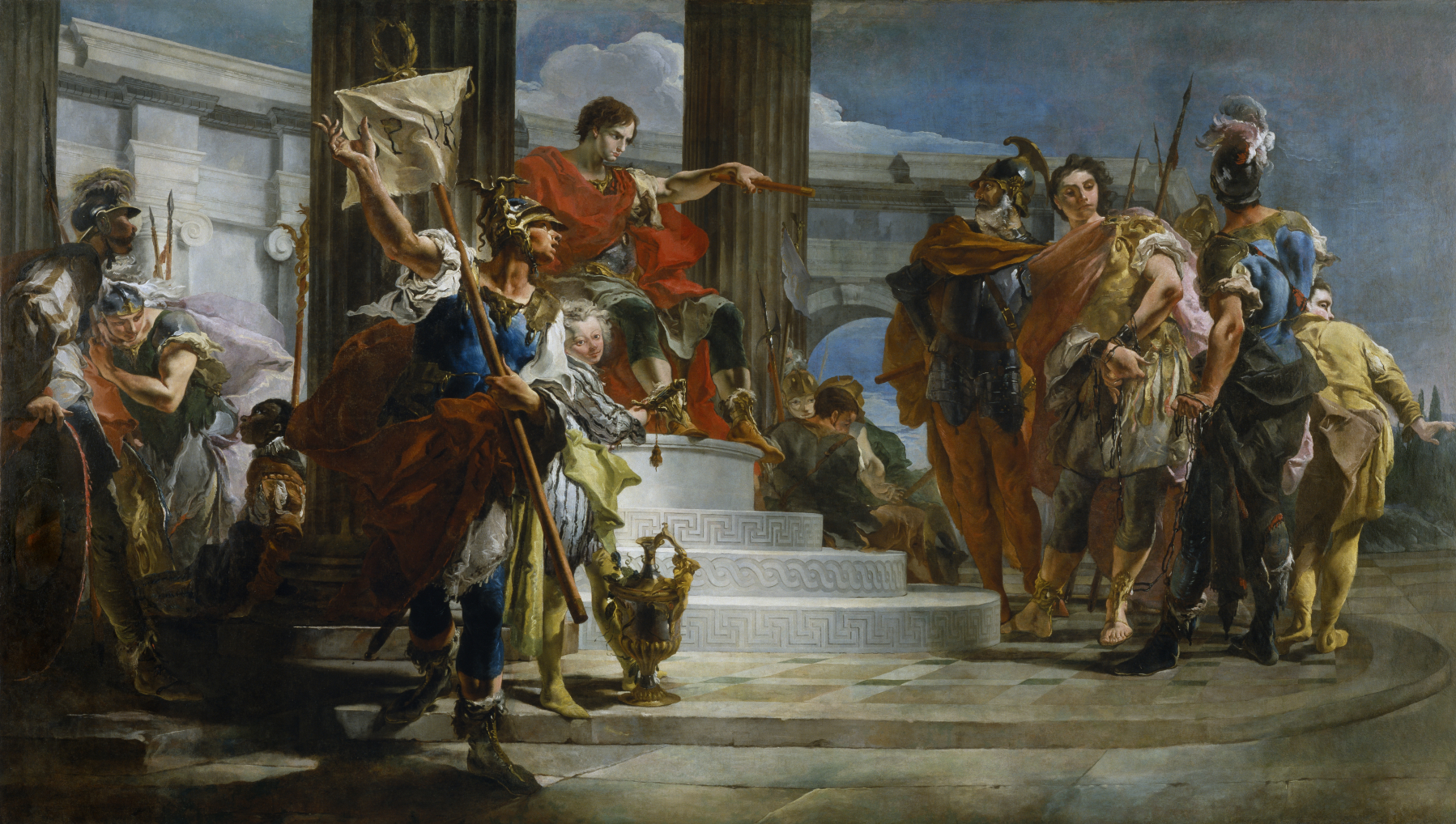
Giovanni Battista Tiepolo, Scipio Africanus Freeing Massiva, c. 1720

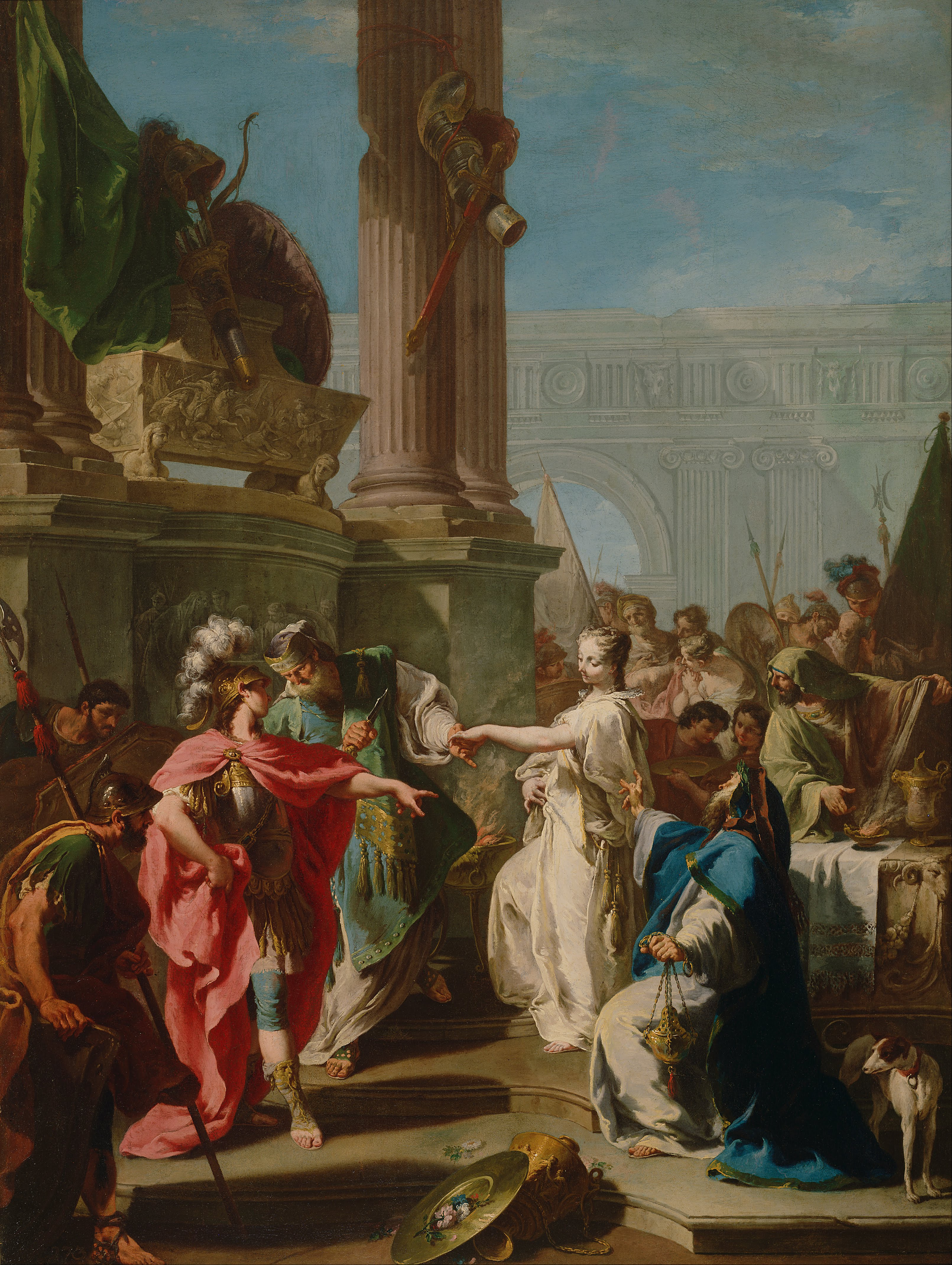
The Sacrifice of Polyxena, Giambattista Pittoni

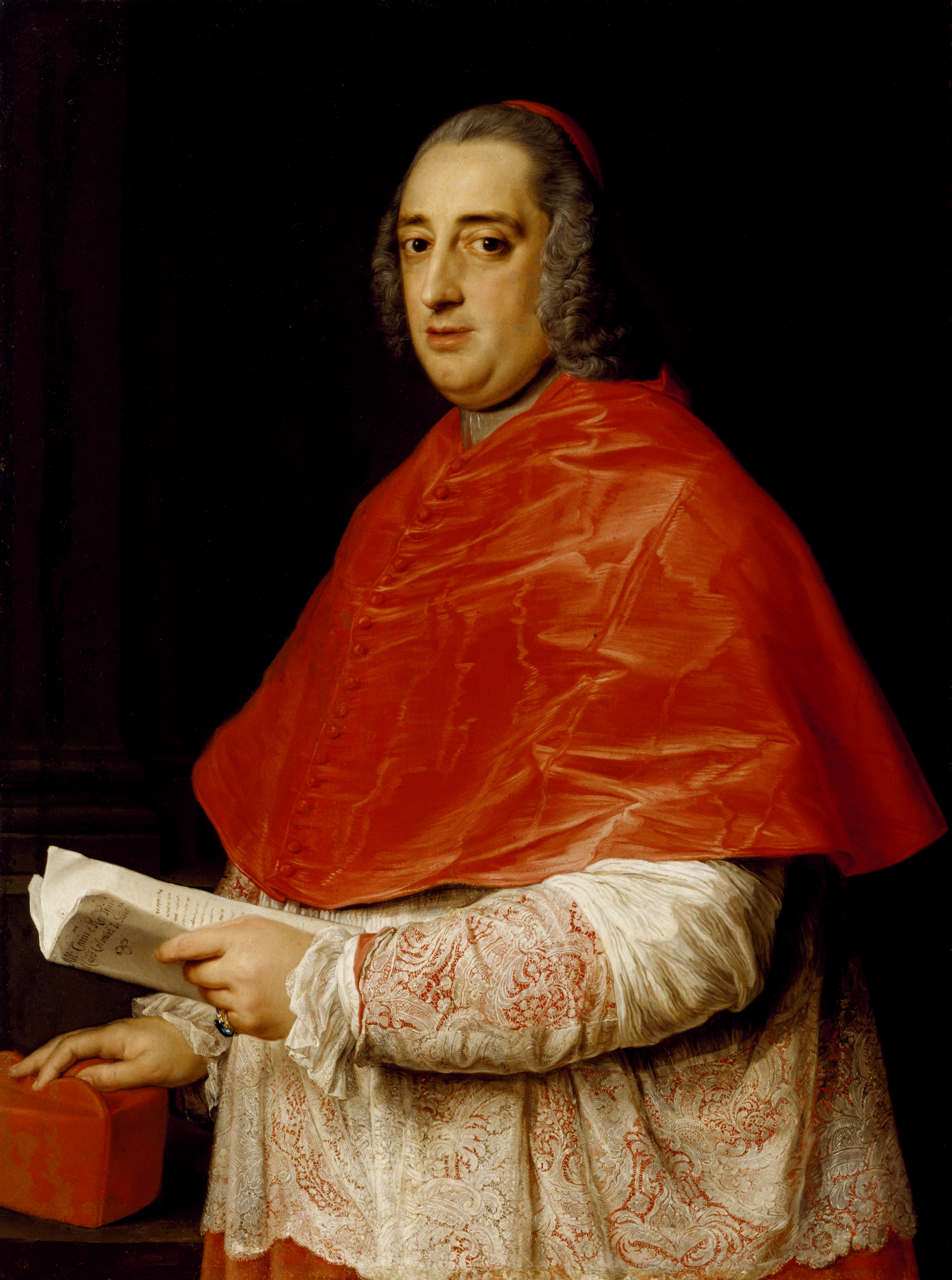
Pompeo Batoni, Portrait of Cardinal Prospero Colonna di Sciarra, c. 1750

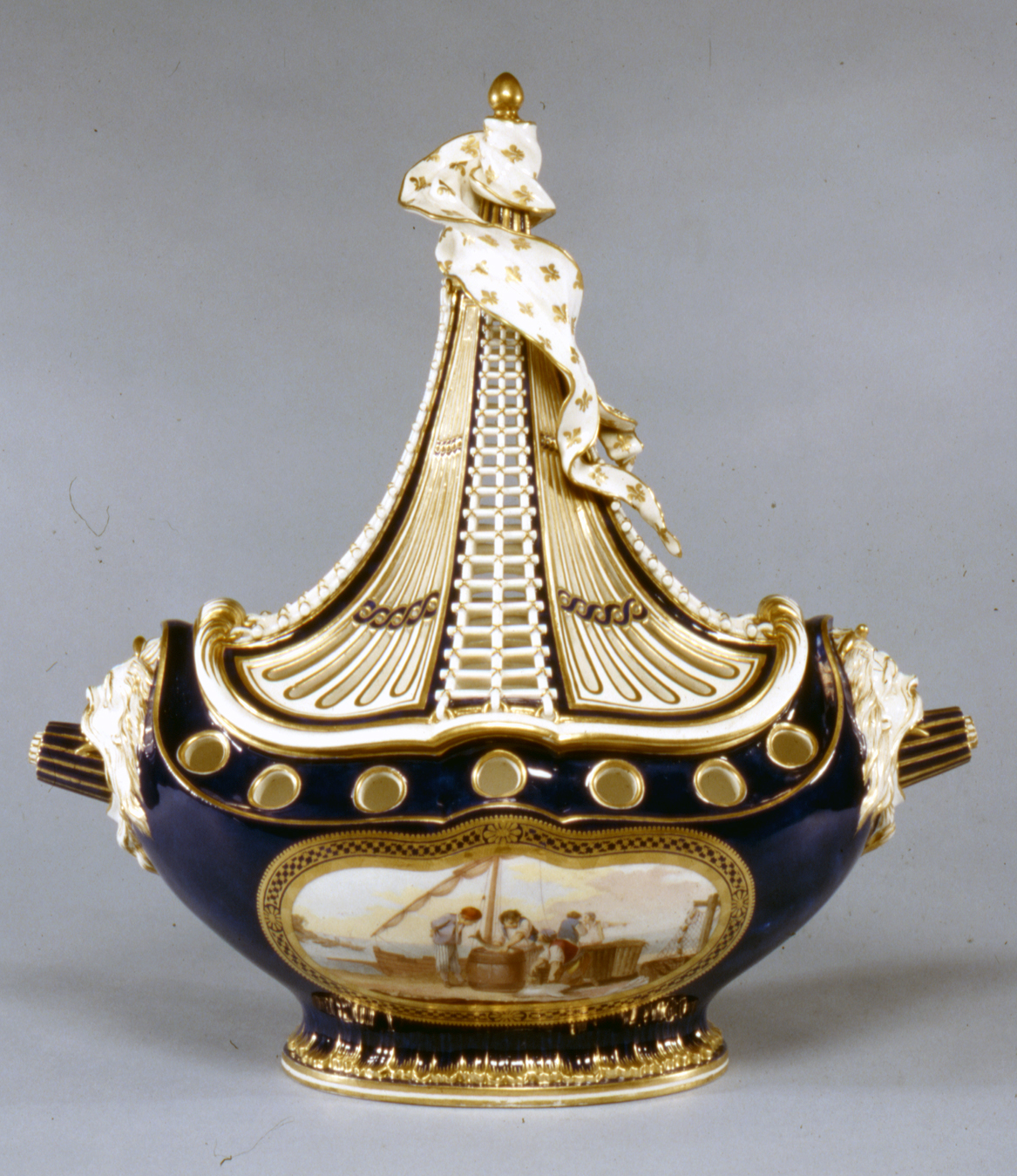
Sèvres pot-pourri vase in the shape of a ship, 1764

=== 19th-century European art ===
William and Henry Walters collected works by late-19th-century French academic masters and Impressionists. Highlights of the collection include Odalisque with Slave by Ingres (a second version); Claude Monet's Springtime; Alfred Sisley's panoramic view of the Seine Valley; and Édouard Manet's realist masterpiece, The Café Concert.

Henry Walters was particularly interested in the courtly arts of 18th-century France. The museum's collection of Sèvres porcelain includes a number of pieces that were made for members of the Royal Bourbon Court at Versailles Palace outside of Paris. Portrait miniatures and the examples of goldsmiths' works, especially snuffboxes and watches, are displayed in the Treasury, along with some exceptional 19th- and early-20th-century works. Among them are examples of Art Nouveau-styled jewelry by René Lalique, jeweled objects by the House of Fabergé, including two Russian Imperial Easter eggs, and precious jewels by Tiffany and Co. of New York City.

The Walters' collection presents an overview of 19th-century European art, particularly art from France. From the first half of the century come major paintings by Ingres, Géricault, and Delacroix. William Walters stayed in Paris with his family during the Civil War, because of his notorious Southern-leanings, and he soon developed a keen interest in contemporary European painting. He either commissioned directly from the artists or purchased at auctions such major works by the Barbizon masters, including Jean-François Millet and Henri Rousseau; the academic masters Jean-Léon Gérôme and Lawrence Alma-Tadema; and even the modernists Monet, Manet and Sisley.

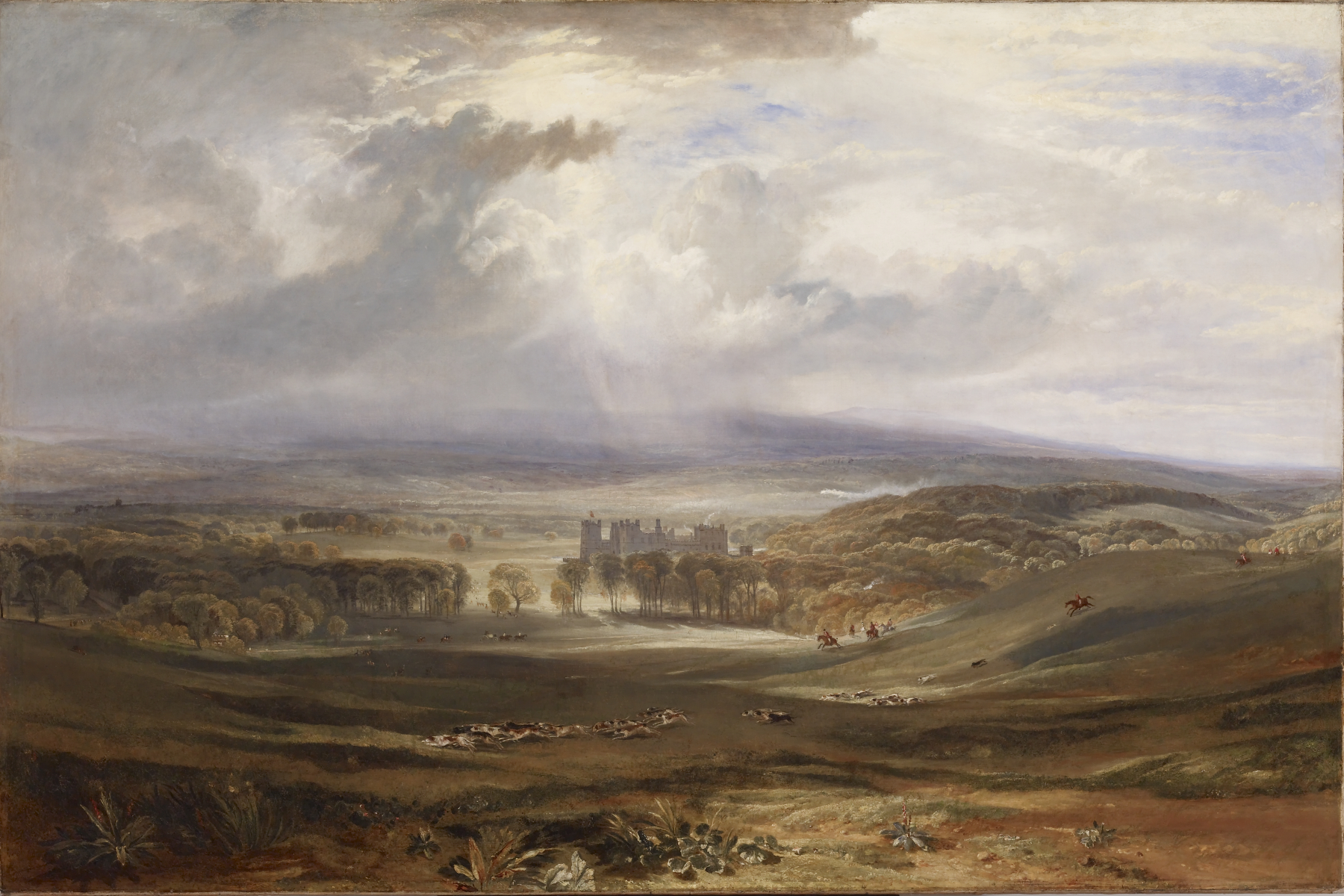
Raby Castle (1817) by Joseph Mallord William Turner

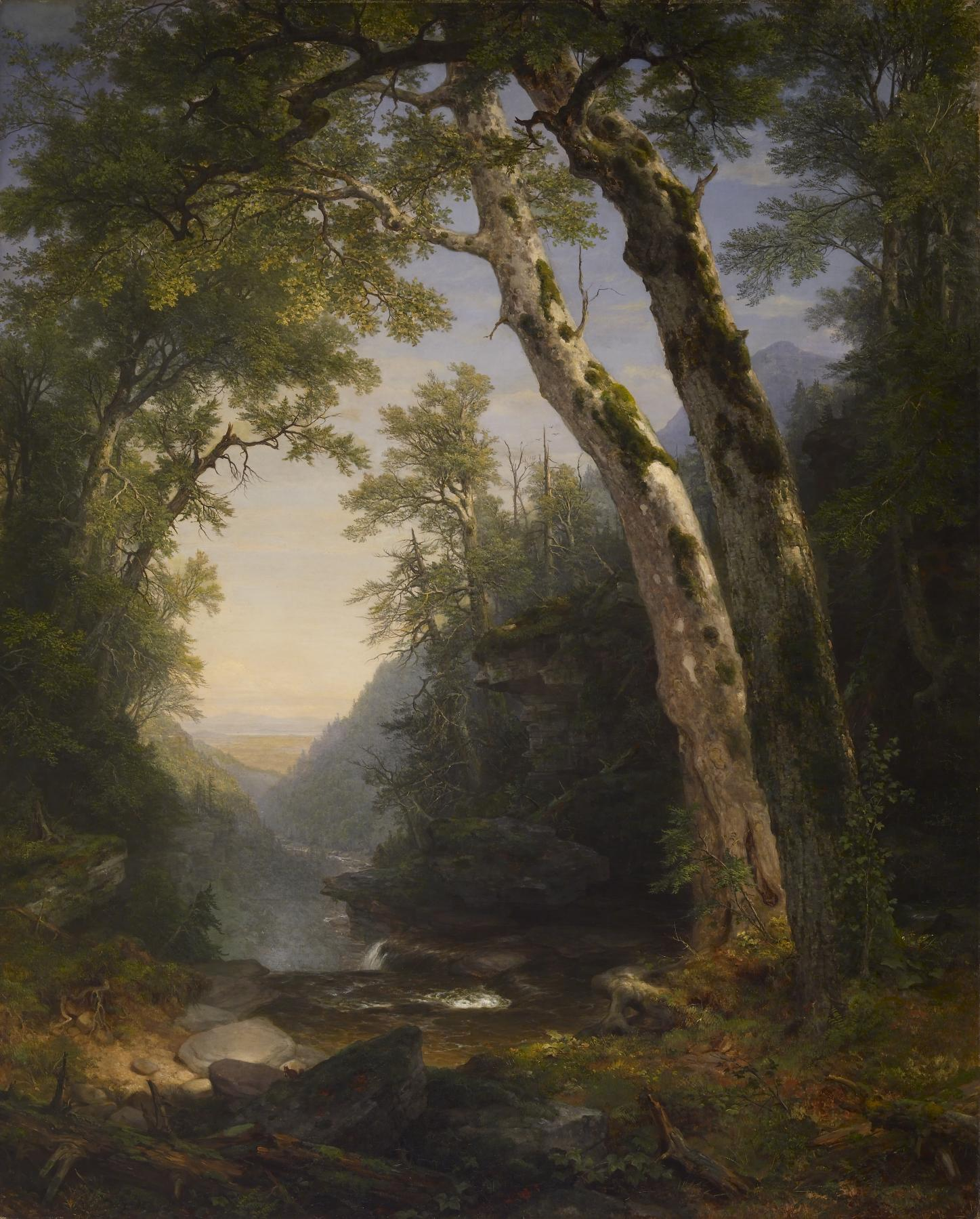
The Catskills (1859) by Asher Brown Durand.

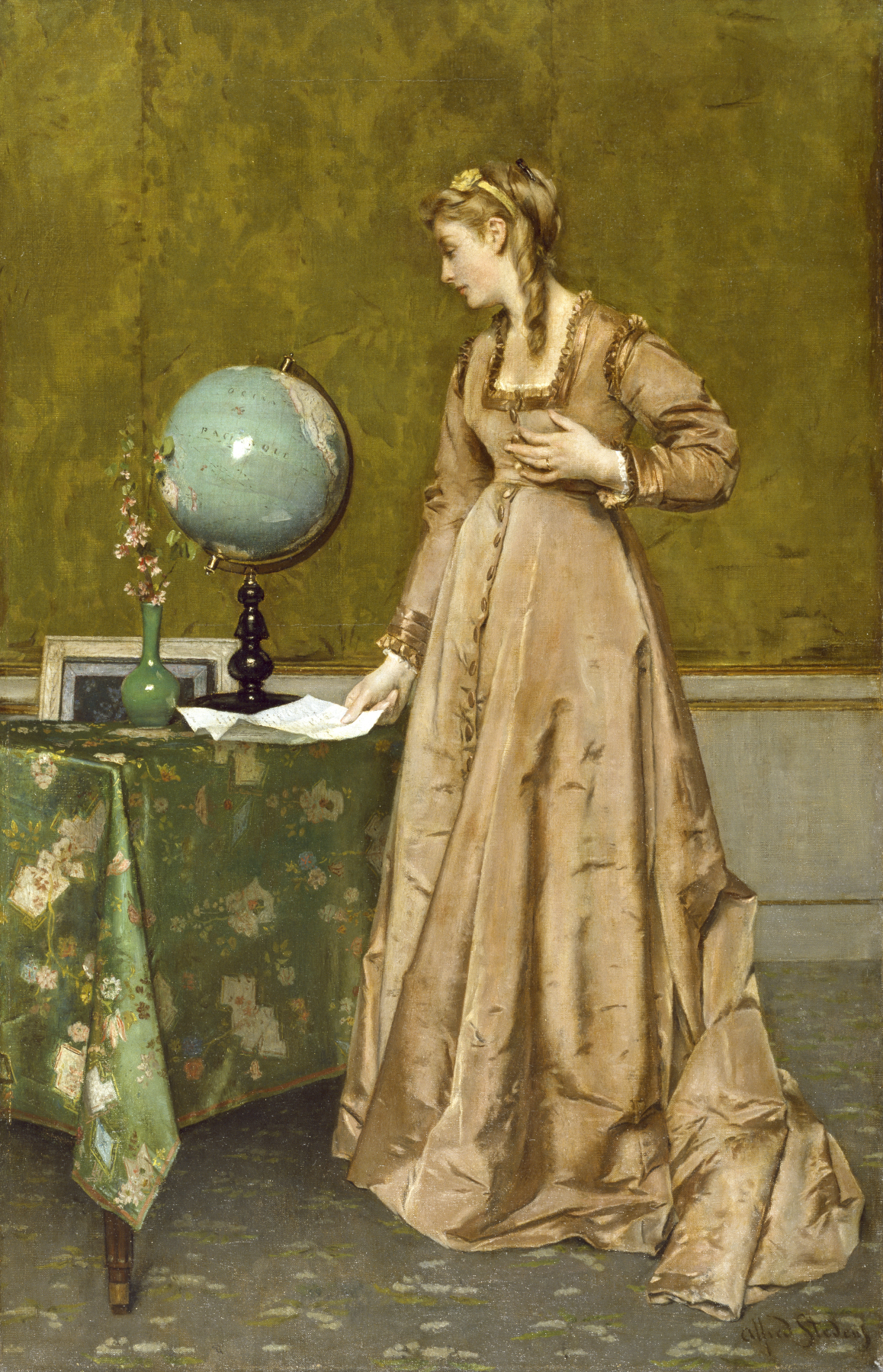
News from Afar (1860) by Alfred Stevens, (Exhibition: "Salute to Belgium, 1980)

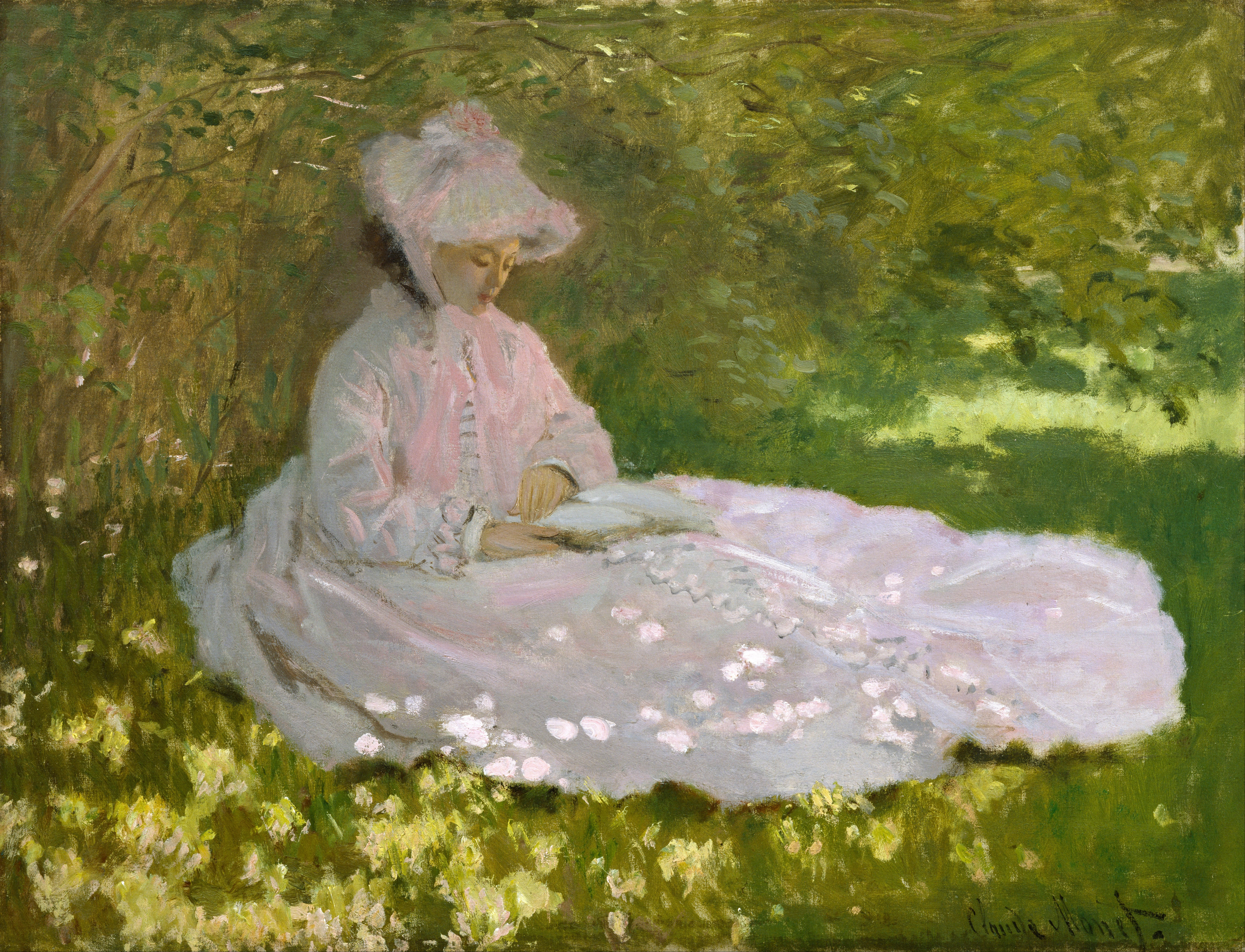
Springtime (1872) by Claude Monet.

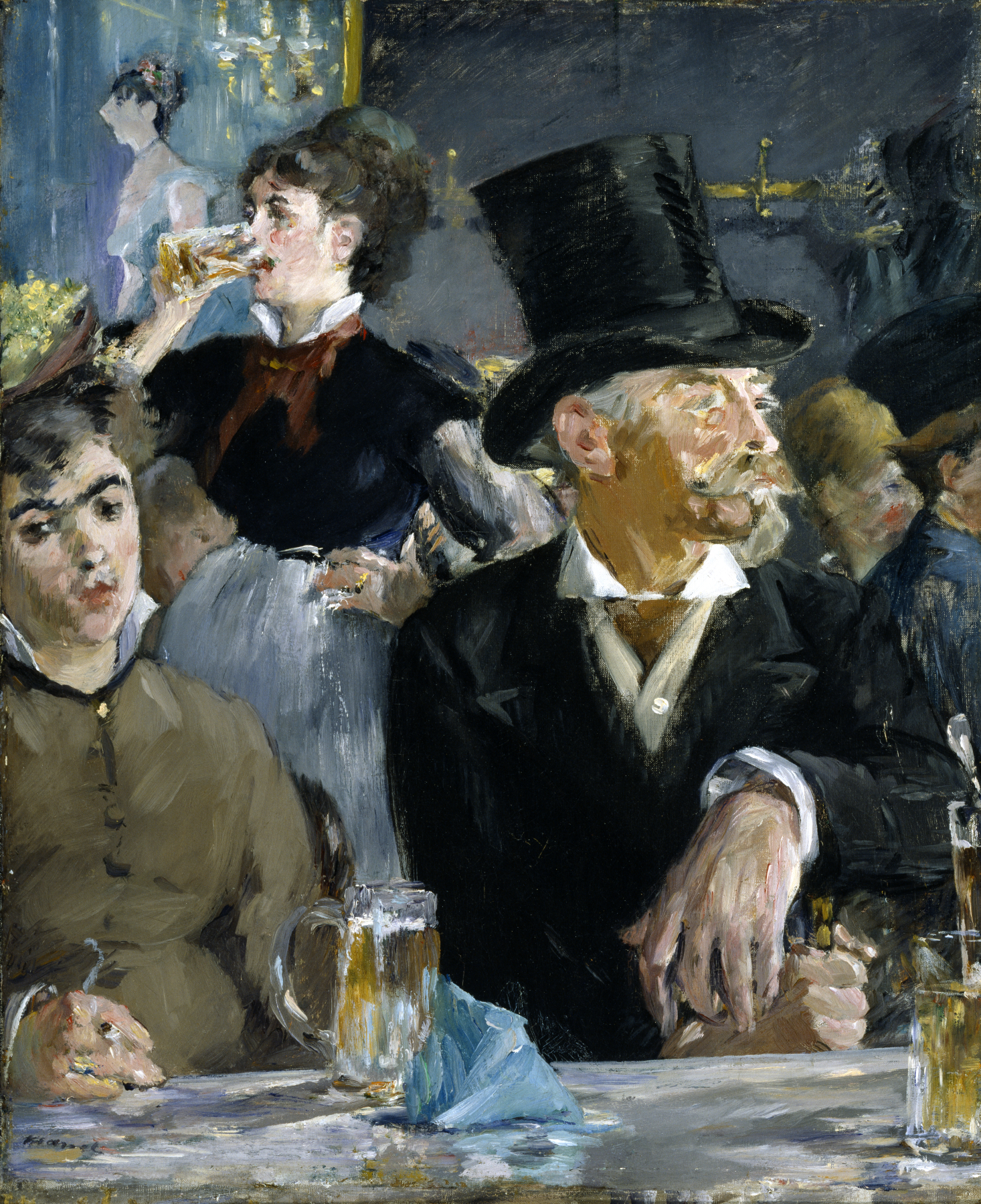
The Café-Concert (ca. 1879) by Édouard Manet.

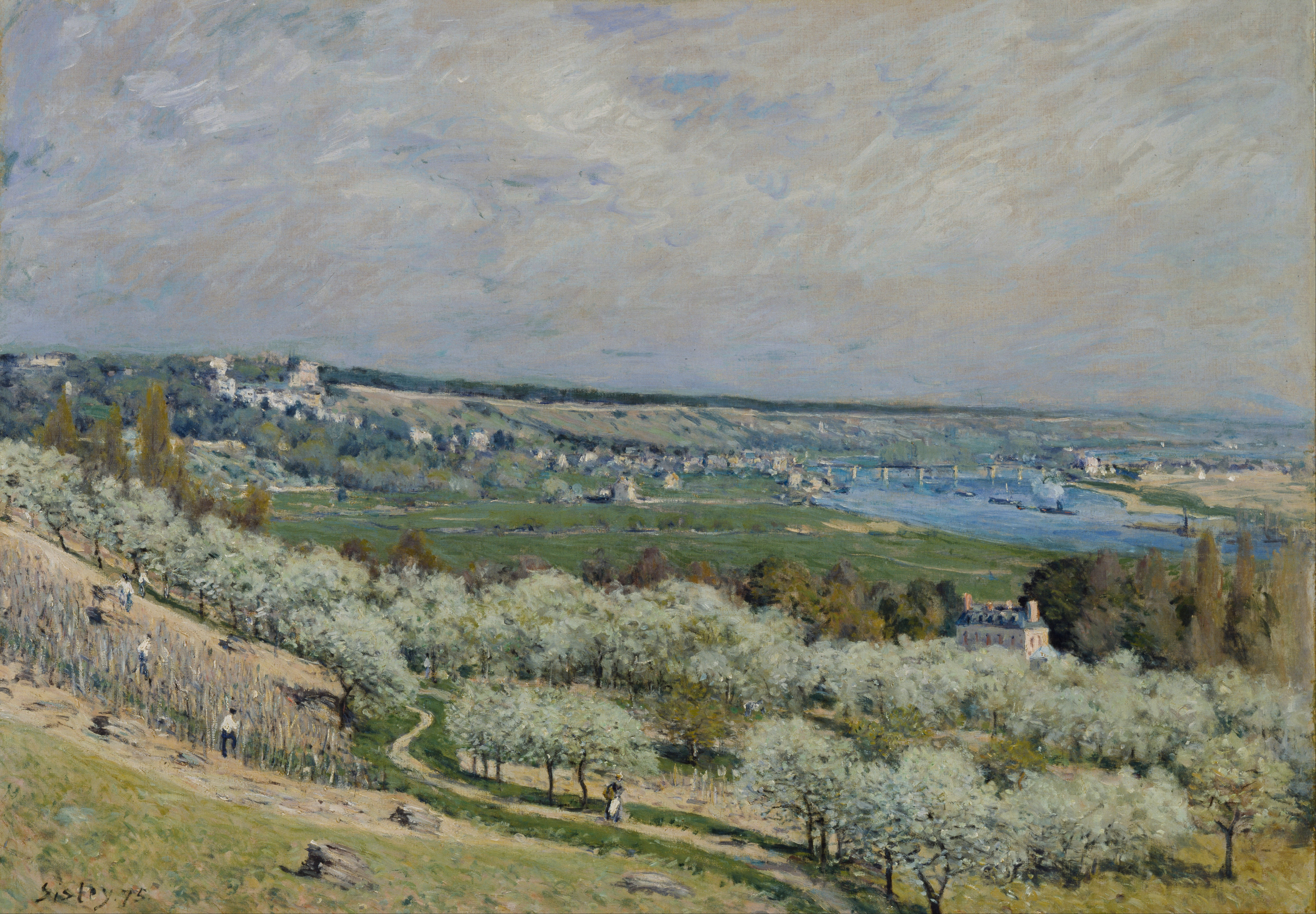
The Terrace at Saint-Germain, Spring (1875) by Alfred Sisley.

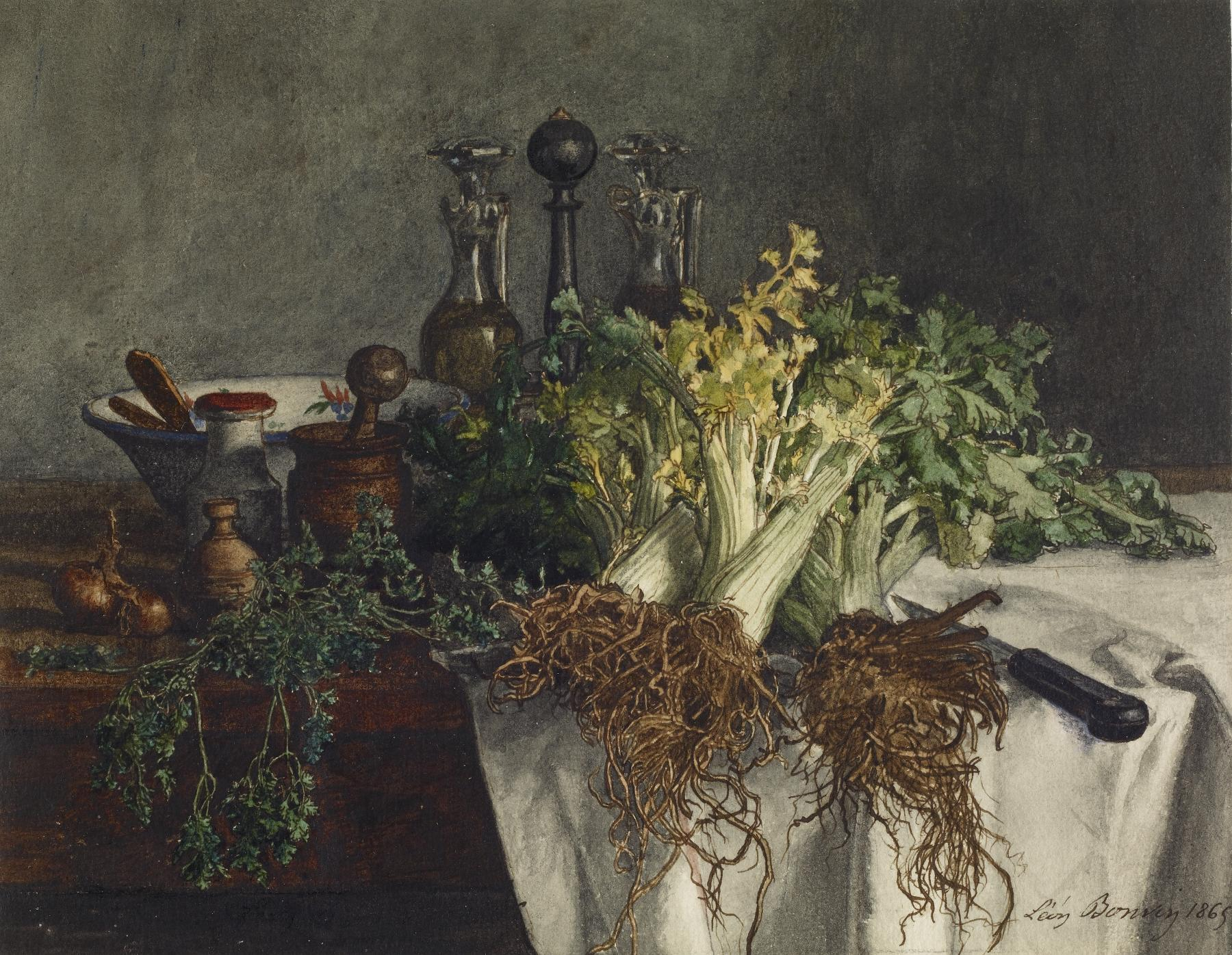
Léon Bonvin – Still Life on Kitchen Table with Celery, Parsley, Bowl, and Cruets – Walters 371504

== Drawings ==
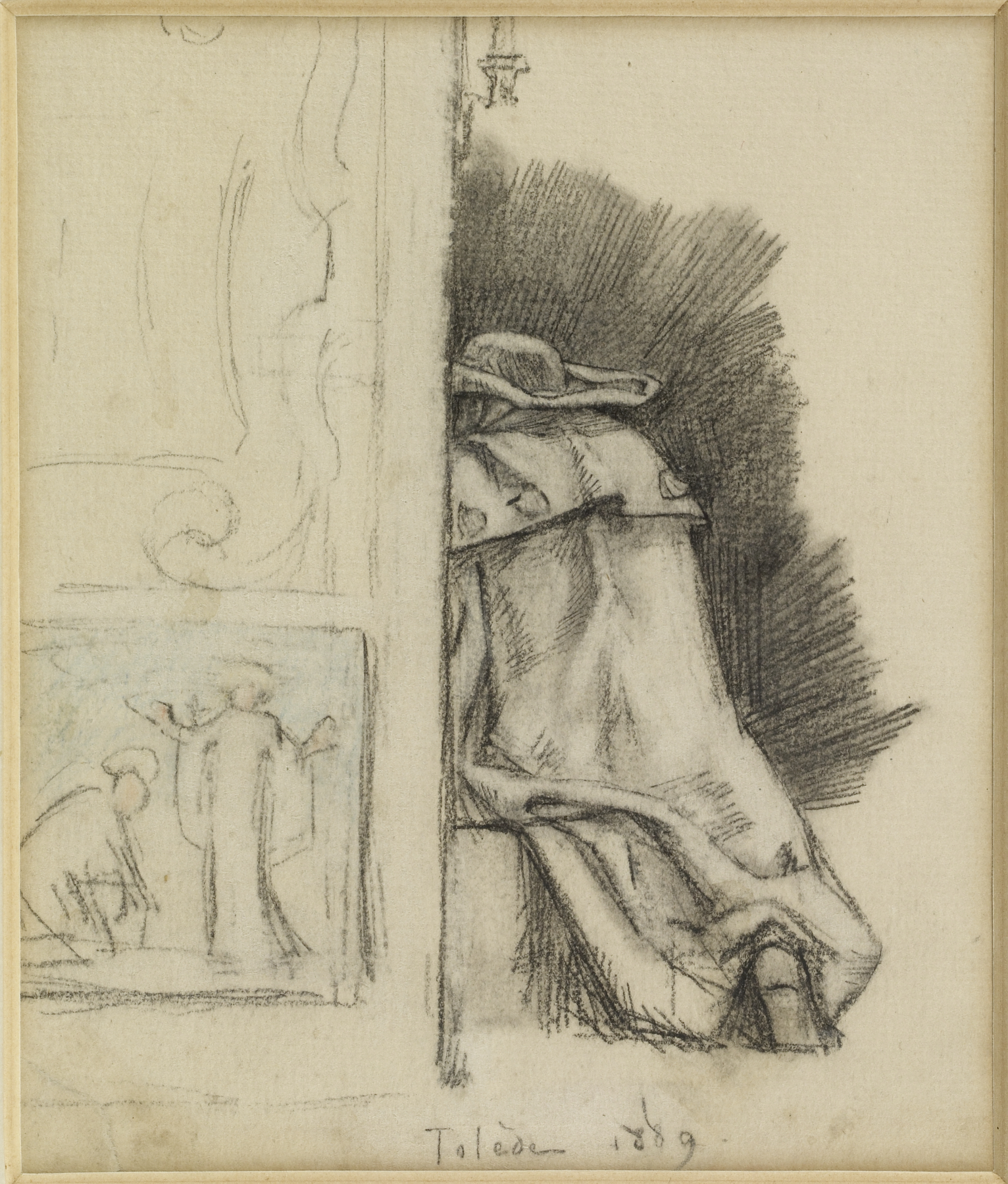
Confessional, Toledo, by Félicien Rops, 1889

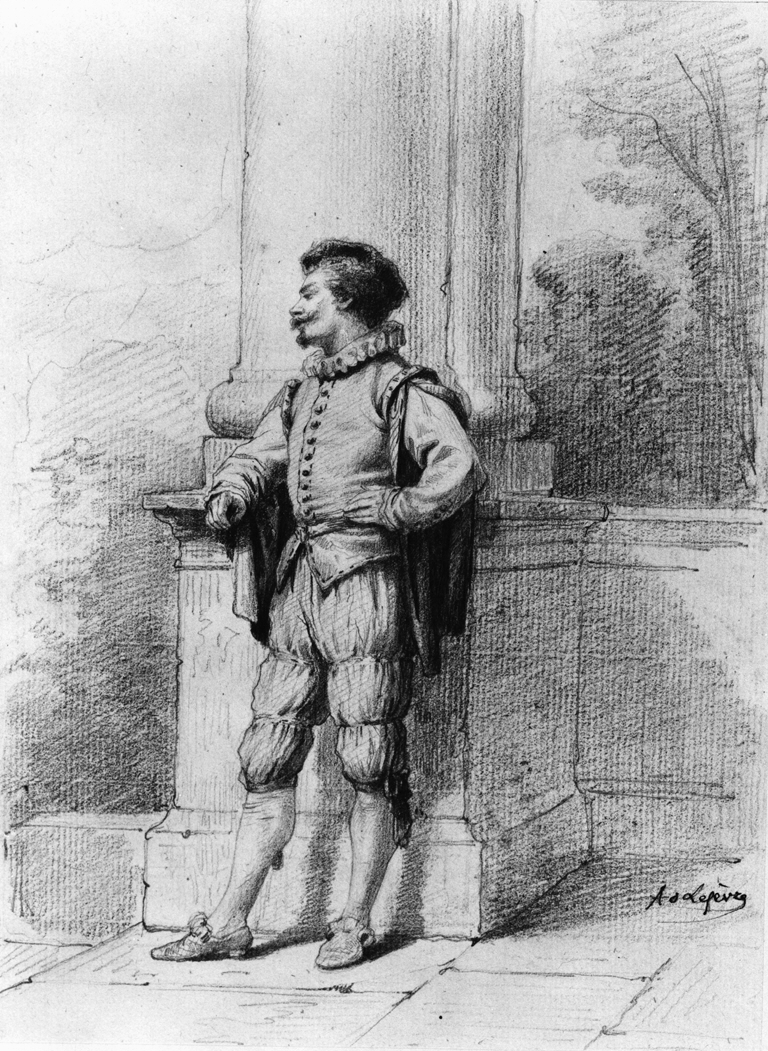
Courtier Standing by a Column, by Adolphe-René Lefèvre, c. 1860

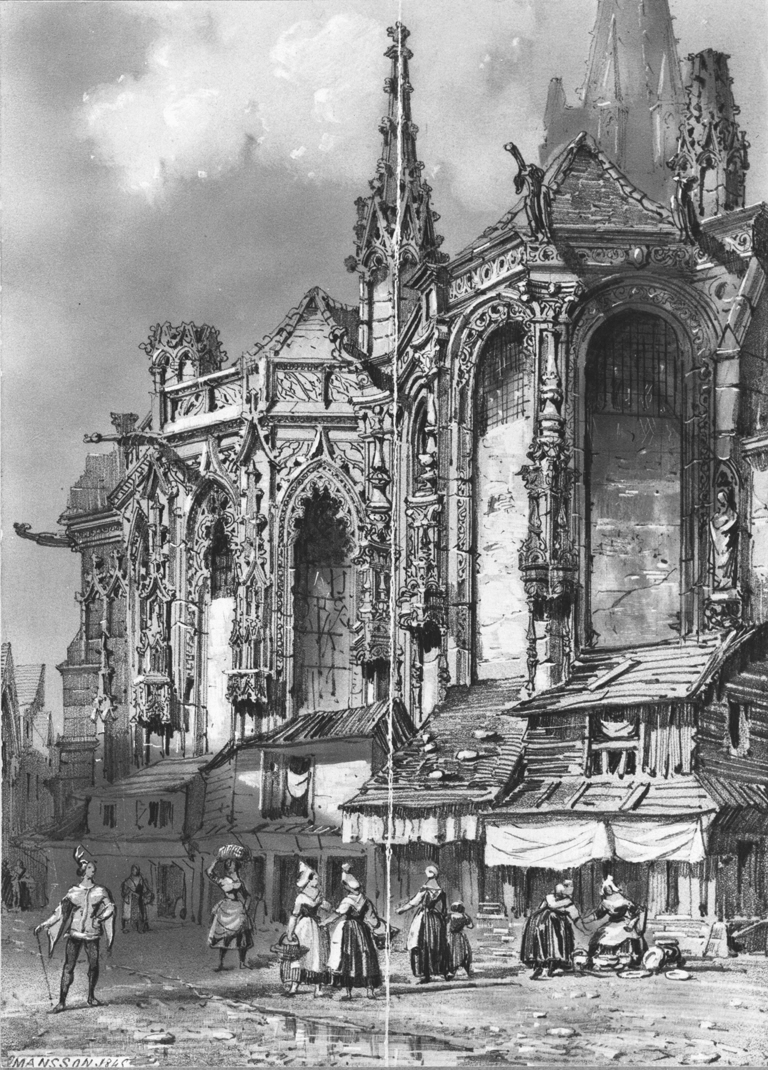
Street Scene with Gothic Building, by Théodore Henri Mansson, 1845

== Buildings ==
=== Charles Street – Old Main Building (1905–1909) ===
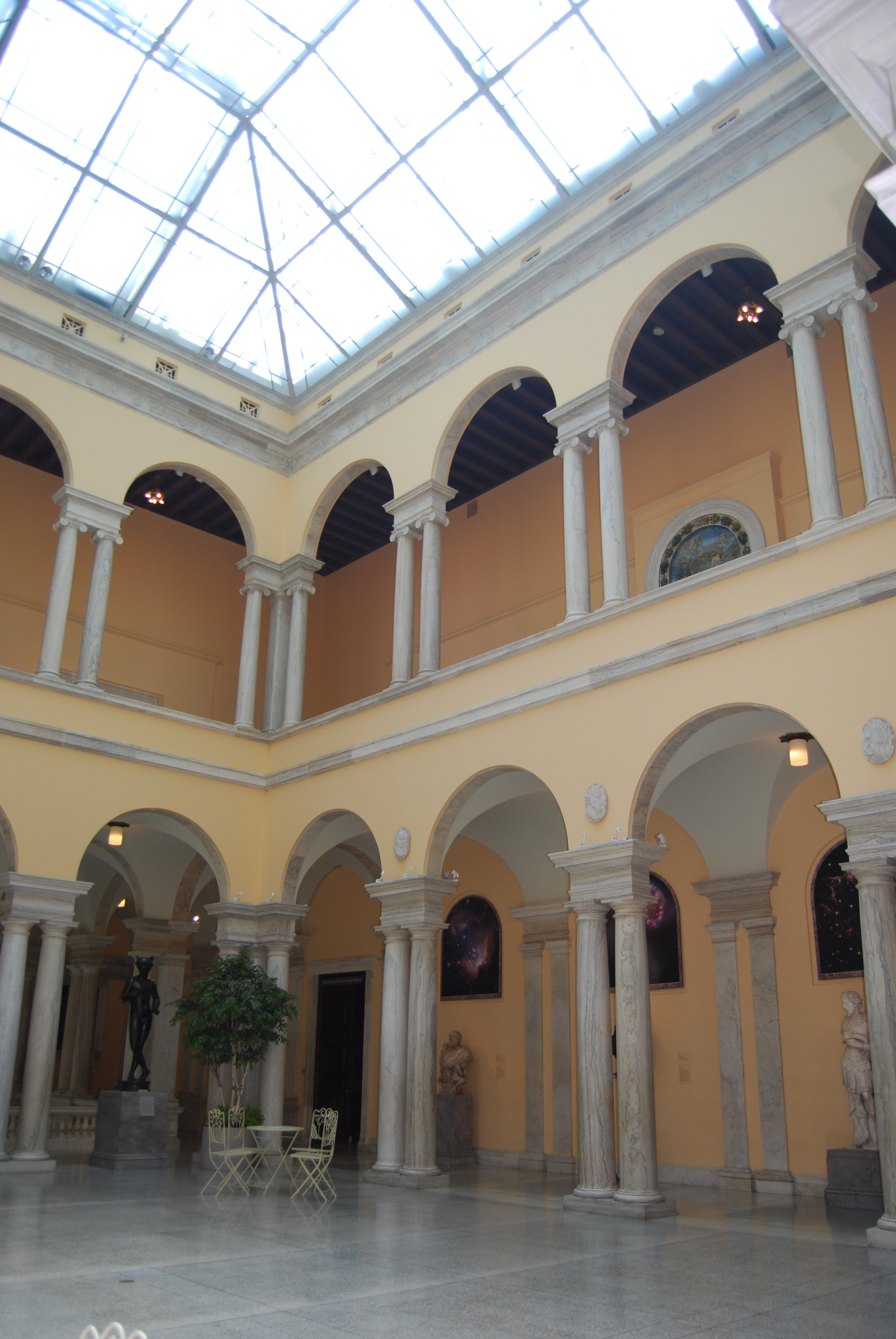
Sculpture Garden (central Great Hall) of the Walters Art Gallery (now Walters Art Museum) in the original Main Building of 1905–1909

Henry Walters' original gallery was designed by architect William Adams Delano and erected between 1904 and 1909, facing South Washington Place (at the northwest corner with West Centre Street) and attached by an overhead bridge/passageway across the back alley from his adjacent townhouse/mansion to the north on West Mount Vernon Place (facing the Washington Monument to the northeast). Its exterior was inspired by the Renaissance-revival-style Hôtel Pourtalès in Paris and its interior was modeled after the 17th-century "Collegio dei Gesuiti" (now the Palazzo dell'Università) built by the Balbi family for the Jesuits in Genoa. The arts of the Renaissance and Baroque periods, French decorative arts of the 18th and 19th centuries, and manuscripts and rare books are now exhibited in this palazzo-style structure.

=== Centre Street Annex Building (1974) ===
Designed by the Boston firm of Shepley, Bulfinch, Richardson & Abbott, in the "Brutalist" poured-concrete style prevailing in the 1960s, (one of the few others in the region of this extremely modernistic style in the city – such as the recently razed Morris A. Mechanic Theatre in downtown Charles Center on the southwest corner of Charles and Baltimore Streets from 1967), this annex building (which has several horizontal lines paralleled with features in the 1909 structure) to the west along West Centre Street and rear of the original main gallery, extending to Park Avenue, opened in 1974. It was substantially altered in 1998–2001 by another firm of Kallmann McKinnell and Wood, Architects, to provide a four-story glass atrium, with a suspended staircase at the juncture between the older and newer buildings with a new entrance lobby along Centre Street. The new lobby, which also provides easier ground-level handicapped access along with enhanced security provisions for both collections and visitors is also providing a café, an enlarged museum and gift store and a reference library.

=== Hackerman House (1850/1991) ===
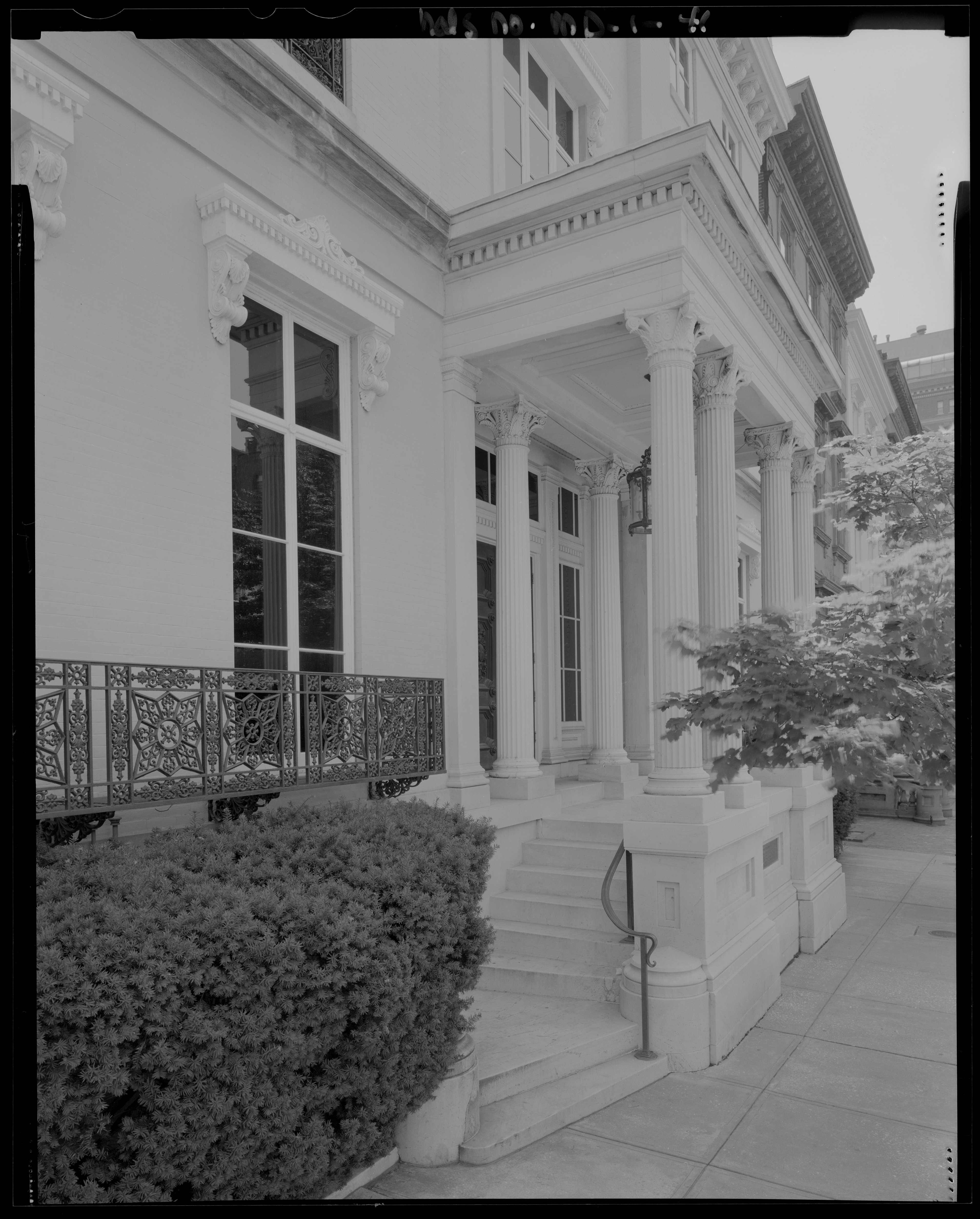
Photo of the Hackerman House

This Greek Revival style townhouse/mansion, one of the most elaborate in the city, was designed by famed local architect John Rudolph Niernsee (1814–1885), and erected between 1848 and 1850 for John Hanson Thomas. It was long regarded as the most "elegant" house along Mount Vernon Place or Washington Place. It sits on the southwest corner of the circle surrounding the Washington Monument and was later owned by the families Jencks and Gladding (and the house has been known as the Thomas-Jencks-Gladding Mansion). Considered in its premiere landmark municipal location to be used for Baltimore City's Official Mayor's Residence (similar to other major American cities mayor's mansions such as Gracie Mansion in a river-front park on New York City's east side of Manhattan, facing the East River), when it was briefly acquired by the city in the late 1950s and then being considered to be razed for an unfortunately poorly-conceived and planned northern expansion of the Gallery engendered local preservationists' protests before being finally re-sold to the Gladding family of a well-known public-spirited local Chevrolet auto dealership, who promised to restore and preserve the noted mansion.

Among the original owning family of the Thomas's distinguished guests of the mid-19th century were the Prince of Wales (eldest son of Queen Victoria), the future King Edward VII (reigned 1901–1910); and General Lajos Kossuth (1802–1894), the then famous Hungarian freedom fighter, president of an early, brief Hungarian republic, veteran of the European Revolutions of 1847–1848 and the "Father of modern Hungary". Since the mid-1980s when, the Thomas-Jencks-Gladding Mansion was reacquired by the city under Mayor William Donald Schaefer (1921–2011), who served the city from 1971 to 1987, and future governor of Maryland (1987–1995) from the Gladding family with a donation by the mayor's friend and local businessman Willard Hackerman, and transferred to the purposes of "The Walters". Since additional renovations with the addition of a connecting gallery with domed skylight and corridor constructed through the top of the old rear carriage house/garage to the south end of the house, and across the east–west alley to the old 1909 Main Building's north side. Reopened in 1991, the newly renamed "Hackerman House" has been devoted to The Walters' recently expanded holdings of Asian art. As "Thomas-Jencks-Gladding House", the building was designated a Baltimore City Landmark in 1975.

== Gallery ==
This is a list of selected works from the museum collection.

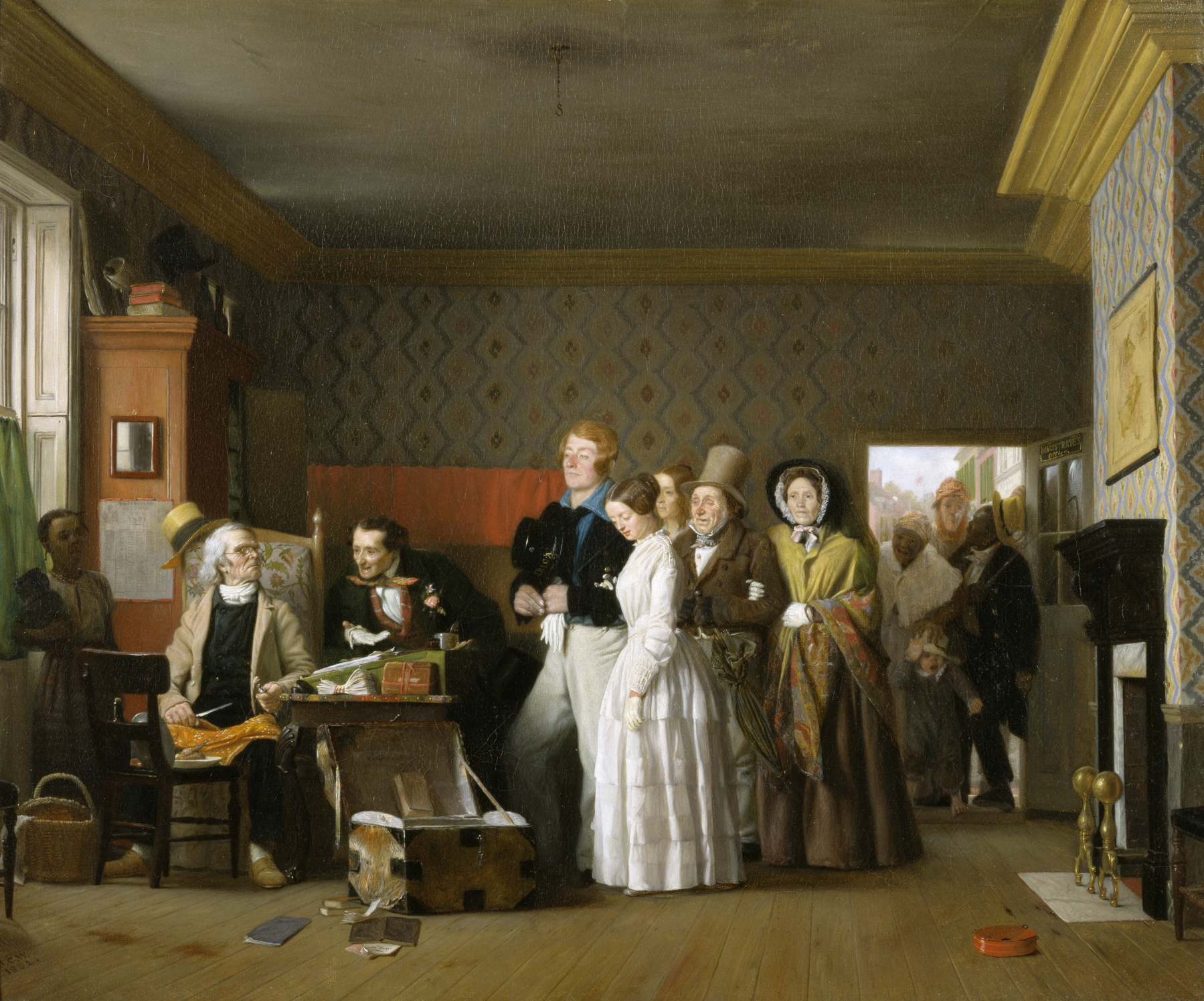
The Sailor's Wedding (1852) by Richard Caton Woodville

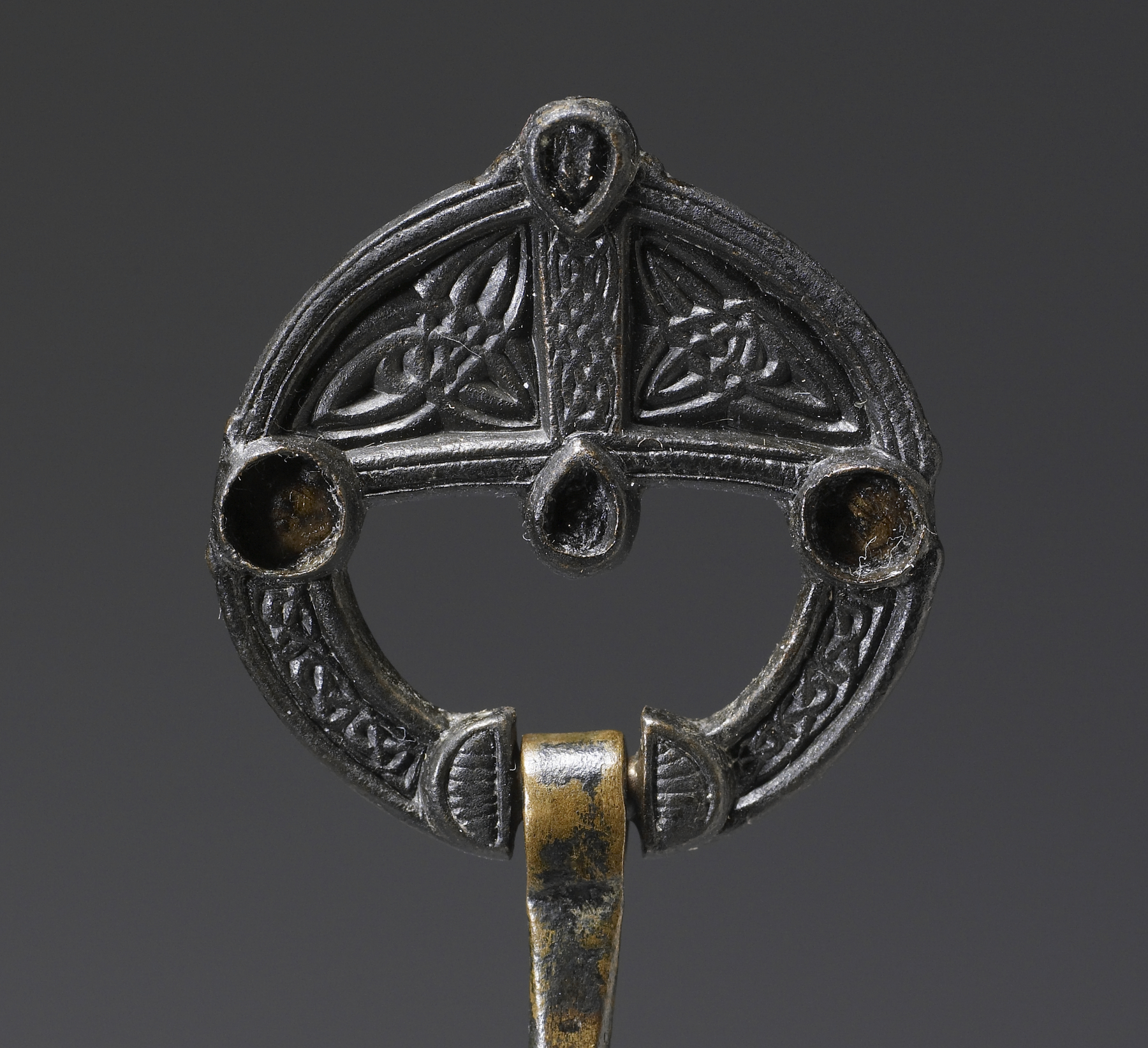
9th-century Irish ring brooch
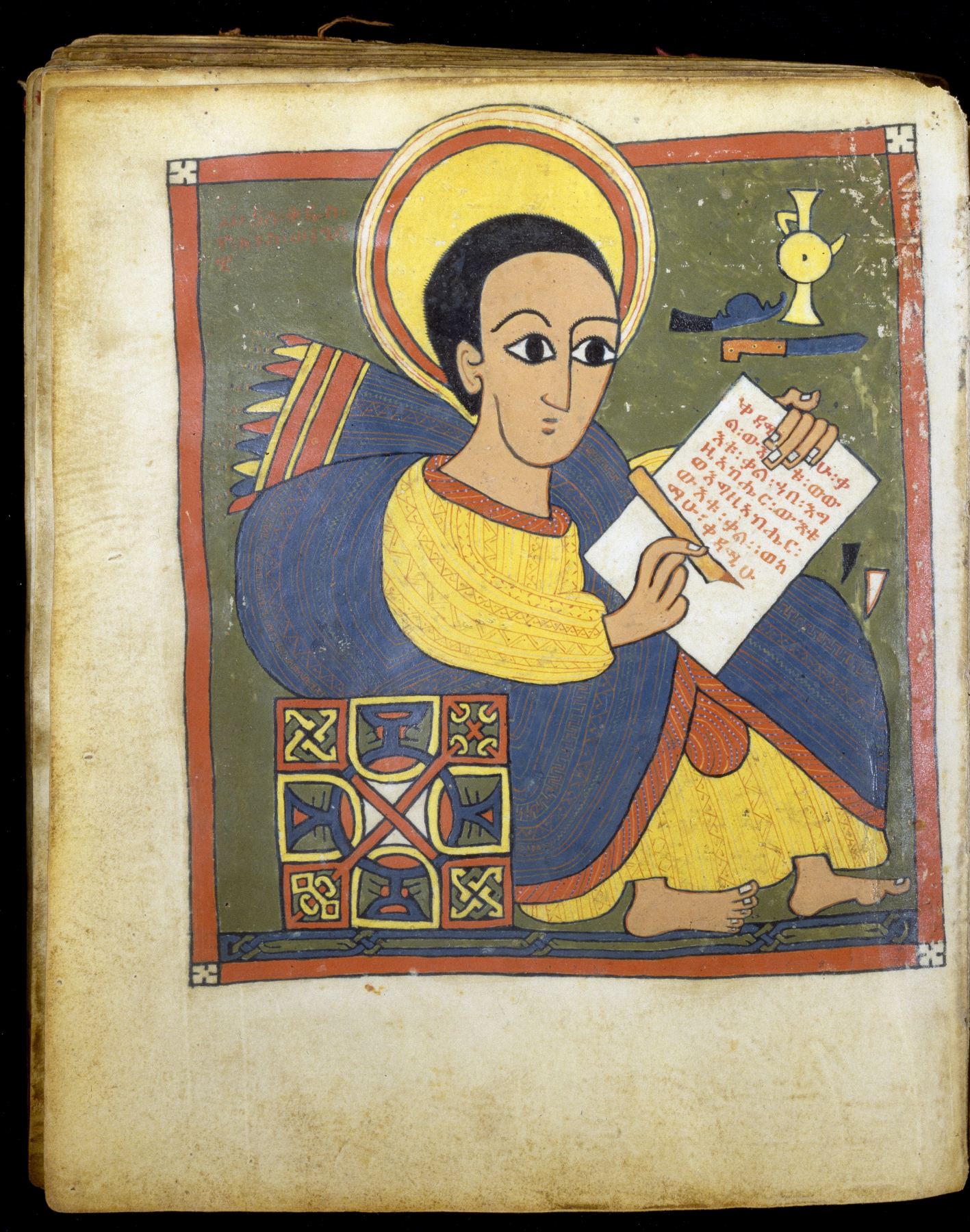
Ethiopian miniature of John the Evangelist, Gunda Gunde Gospel Book, c. 1540

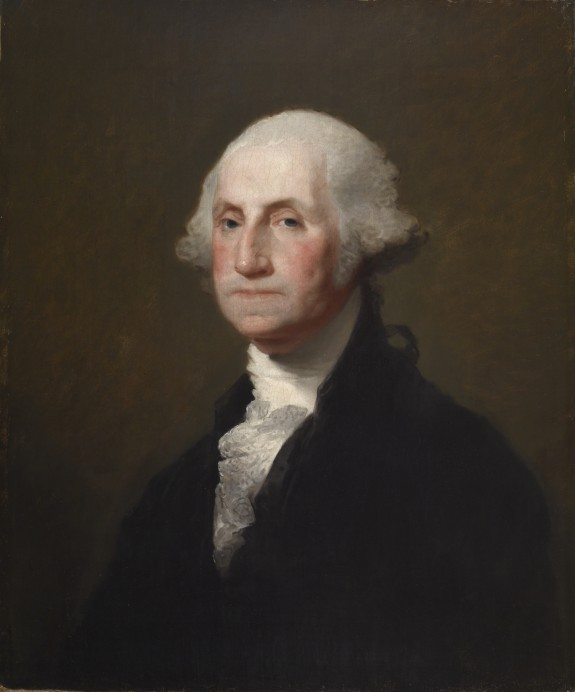
George Washington (1825) by Gilbert Stuart

The Church at Eragny (1884) by Camille Pissarro

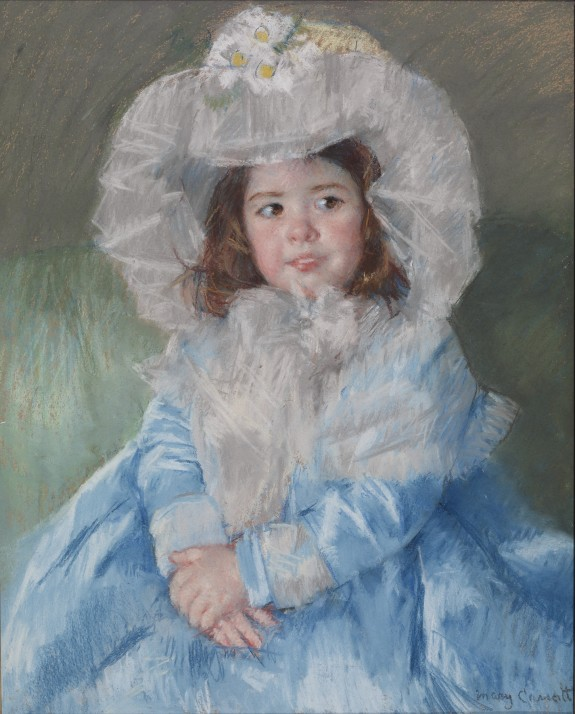
Margot in Blue (1902) by Mary Cassatt.

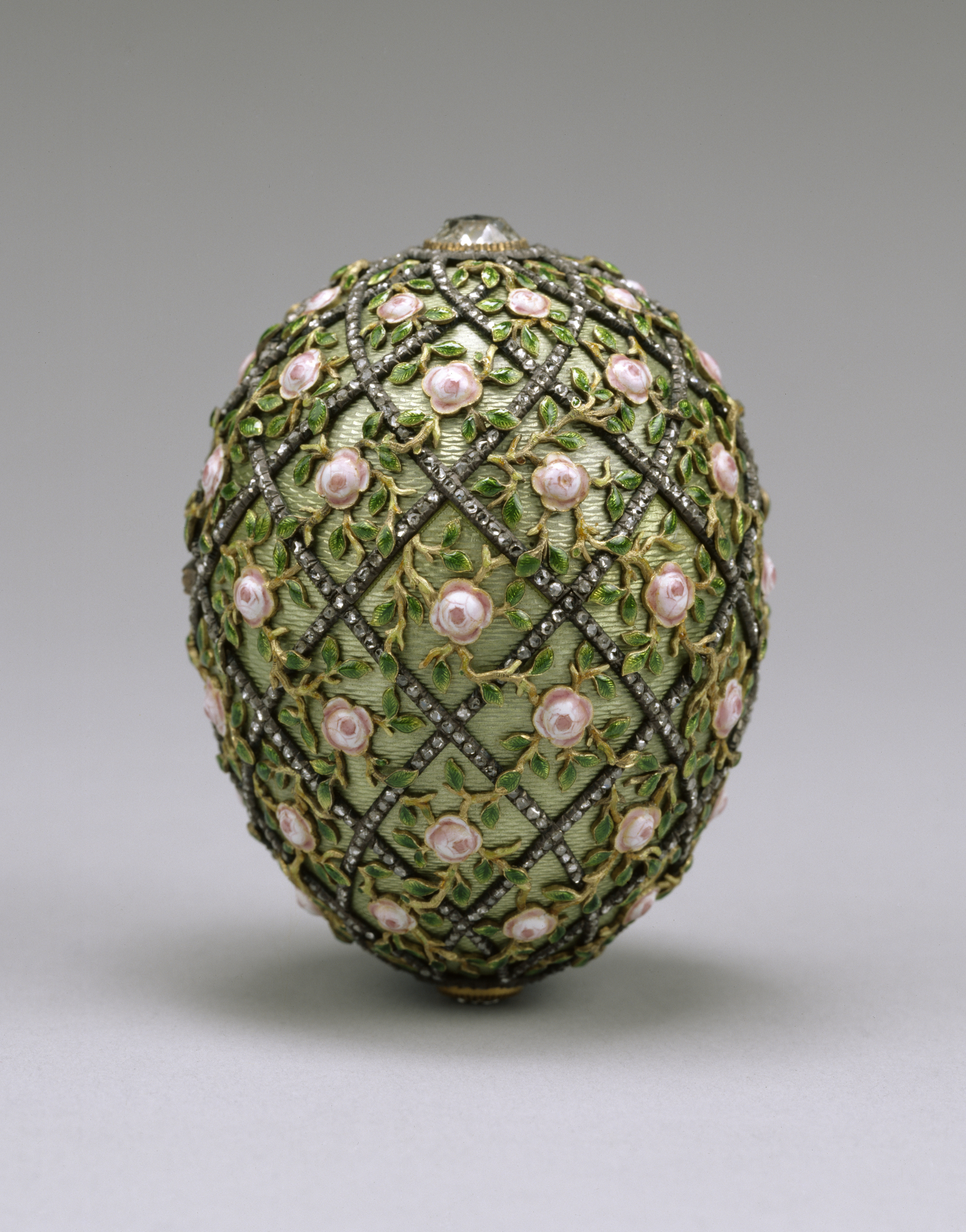
Rose Trellis Imperial Easter Egg (1907) by Peter Carl Fabergé.

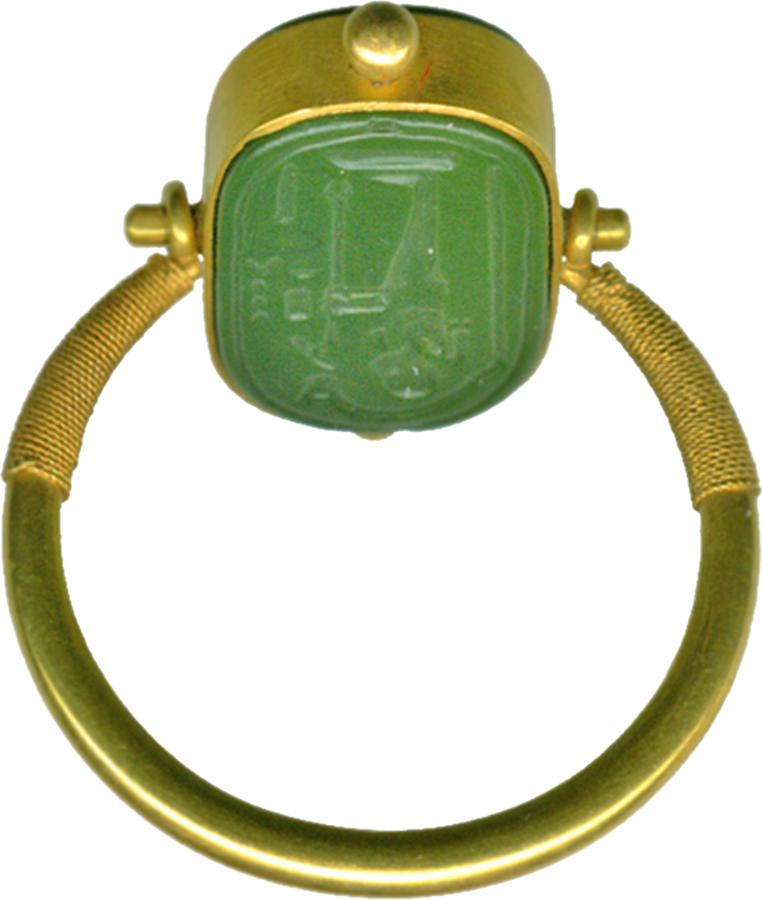
Moveable ring from 664 to 322 BC. Green jasper and gold. The Walters Art Museum.

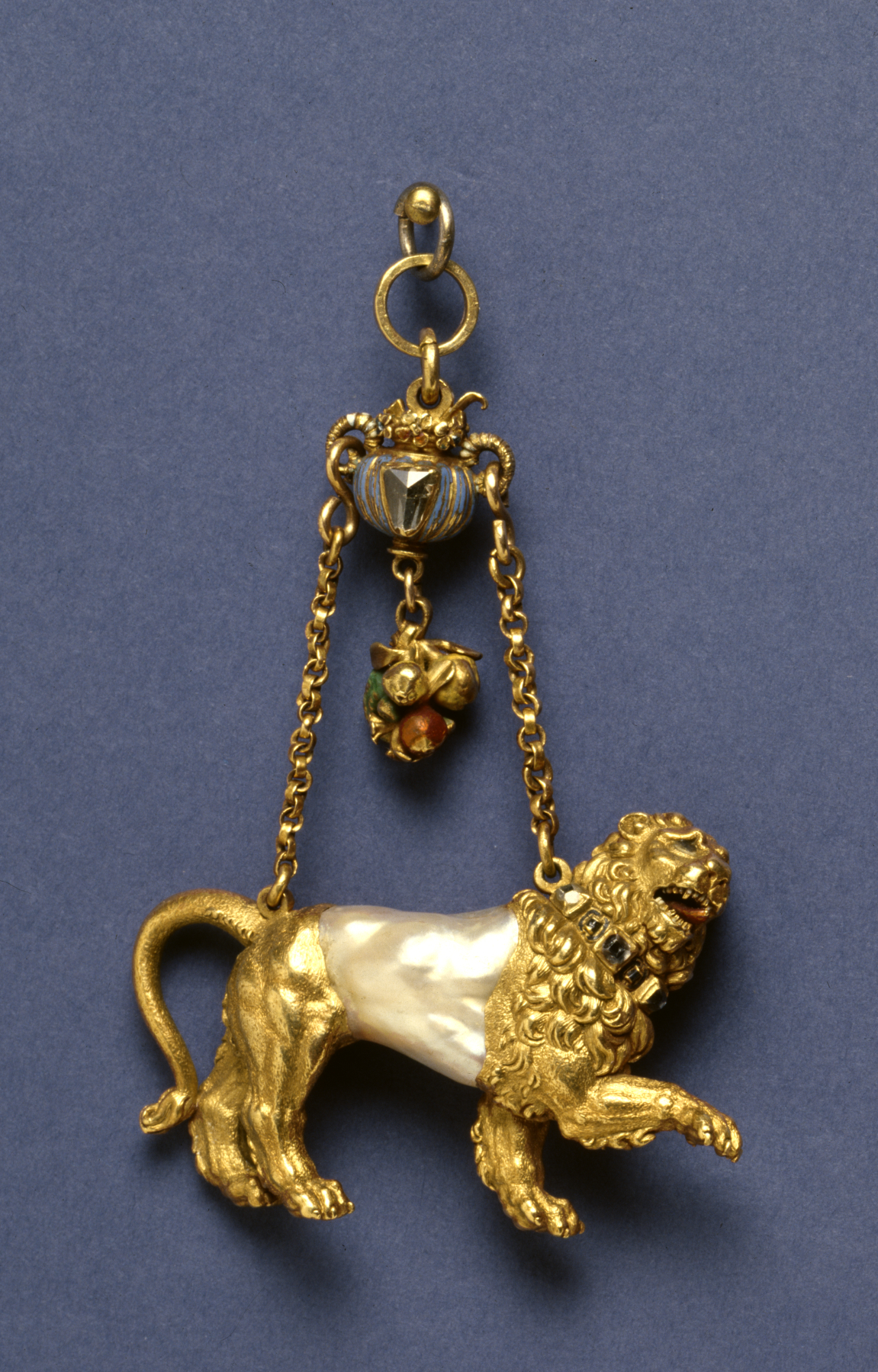
Pendant with a Lion, Flemish, (between 1600 and 1650) Baroque

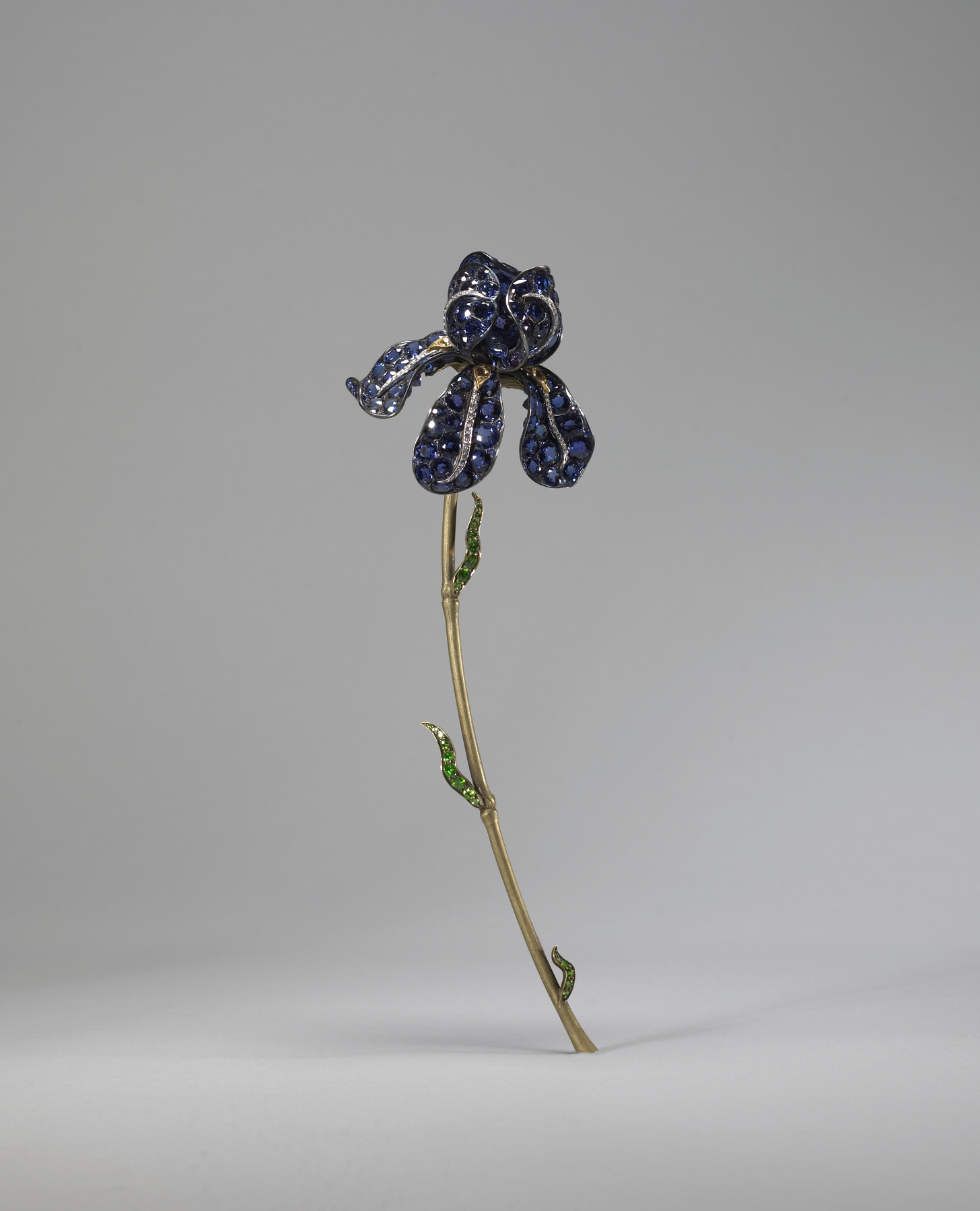
Iris Corsage Ornament (c. 1900) by Tiffany & Company.

== See also ==
- Collaboration Between Walters Art Museum and Wikimedia Commons
- Union busting
- American Art Collaborative
- Archimedes Palimpsest
- Baltimore Museum of Art
- William Henry Rinehart
- Peabody Institute
- George Peabody Library
- Charles Street
- Washington Monument
- Parker Building (New York City), earlier location of Walters' art collection

== Additional sources ==
- The Walters Art Gallery, Guide to the Collections, 1997, Scala Books, ISBN 978-0911886481
- Rines, George Edwin, ed. (1920). "Walters Collection" . Encyclopedia Americana.
- Gruelle, R. B., Collection of William Thompson Walters (Boston 1895)
- Bushnell, S. W., Oriental Ceramic Art Collections of William Thompson Walters (New York 1899)
