= METRC =

METRC may refer to:

- Marijuana Enforcement Tracking Reporting Compliance, an American cannabis tracking system
- Major Extremity Trauma Research Consortium, a network of clinical centers studying the treatment of orthopedic trauma
