= Zanvil =

Zanvil or Zanvyl is a given name. Notable people with this name include:

- Zanvil A. Cohn, American physician
- Zanvil Weinberger, Israeli singer
- Zanvyl Krieger, American businessman and philanthropist

== See also ==
Zanvyl Krieger School of Arts and Sciences
