= The SAIS Review of International Affairs =

- Discipline: International relations
- Language: English
- Edited by: Editor-in-Chief: Haseeb Ali Senior Editor: Emma Ulvin Managing Editor: Kaushar Barejiya Media Editor: Aaryaman Shah Podcast Editor: Ayesha Jilani

Publication details
- History: 1956–present
- Publisher: Johns Hopkins University Press (United States)
- Frequency: Biannually

Standard abbreviations
- ISO 4: SAIS Rev. Int. Aff.

Indexing
- ISSN: 0036-0775 (print); 1088-3142 (web)
- OCLC no.: 7251414

Links
- Journal homepage; Online access

The SAIS Review of International Affairs is an academic journal of international relations. Founded in 1956, the journal is based at the Paul H. Nitze School of Advanced International Studies (SAIS), a graduate school of Johns Hopkins University in Washington, D.C. The journal's mission is to advance the debate on leading contemporary issues in world affairs. Its biannual print edition is published by Johns Hopkins University Press and available online through Project Muse. The SAIS Review also publishes articles on its online edition year-round on a rolling basis and produces a podcast called The Looking Glass. Notable contributors to the print and online editions of the SAIS Review include Joe Biden, George H. W. Bush, Madeleine Albright, Bill Richardson, Richard Holbrooke, Rahul Gupta, Todd D. Robinson, and Piero Gleijeses.

The journal's advisory board is made up of members of the SAIS administration and faculty as well as leading academics, journalists, and policymakers, including: James Steinberg (chairperson), Cinnamon Dornsife (Faculty Advisor), Carla Freeman, Kent E. Calder, Jessica Fanzo, James Mann, Manjari Miller, Afshin Molavi, Moisés Naím, Thomas Rid, and Edward P. Joseph.

Articles appearing in The SAIS Review are indexed in the Public Affairs Information Service (PAIS), International Political Science Abstracts, and International in Print Bulletin. The full text of SAIS Review articles is also available in the electronic versions of the Social Sciences Index.

== See also ==
- List of international relations journals
