= Rong Li =

American cell biologist (born 1967)

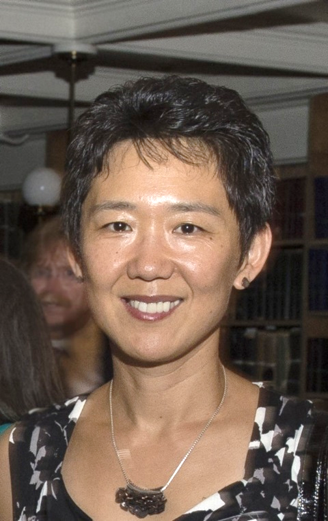
- Born: Rong Li; 1967 (age 58–59); Beijing
- Education: Yale University (B.S., M.S.); University of California, San Francisco (Ph.D.); University of California, Berkeley (postdoctoral fellowship)
- Known for: Cell biology Cellular asymmetry Cell dynamics Aneuploidy; Cell morphology Eukaryotic cells Oogenesis; Cell migration
- Awards: Bloomberg Distinguished Professorships (2015); William Neaves Award (2010-2012); Hoechst Marion Roussel Award (now the Aventis Award) (1999-2001)
- Scientific career
- Fields: Cell biology Evolutionary biology Chemical engineering Biomolecular engineering
- Workplaces: Johns Hopkins University Stowers Institute for Medical Research
- Doctoral advisor: Andrew W Murray
- Website: cellbio.jhmi.edu/people/faculty/rong-li-phd

Rong Li is the Director of Mechanobiology Institute, a Singapore Research Center of Excellence, at the National University of Singapore. She is a Distinguished Professor at the National University of Singapore's Department of Biological Sciences and Bloomberg Distinguished Professor of Cell Biology and Chemical & Biomolecular Engineering at the Johns Hopkins School of Medicine and Whiting School of Engineering. She previously served as Director of Center for Cell Dynamics in the Johns Hopkins School of Medicine’s Institute for Basic Biomedical Sciences. She is a leader in understanding cellular asymmetry, division and evolution, and specifically, in how eukaryotic cells establish their distinct morphology and organization in order to carry out their specialized functions. Rong's two biggest focus areas include cell aging and tissue aging.

== Biography ==
Rong Li was born in Beijing, China in 1967. She was the first high school graduate from the People's Republic of China admitted to Yale University. She went on to graduate in four years from Yale University Summa Cum Laude and with Distinction in Major with a combined B.S. and M.S. in Biophysics & Biochemistry. She then earned a Ph.D. in Cell Biology through the Herbert W. Boyer Program in Biological Sciences (PIBS) at the University of California, San Francisco, and subsequently completed a postdoctoral fellowship at the University of California, Berkeley in Molecular Cell Biology. In 1994, she accepted an assistant professorship in cell biology at Harvard University, rising to the associate level in 2000. From 2005 to 2015, she was an Investigator at the Stowers Institute for Medical Research and an affiliated Professor in the Department of Molecular and Integrative Physiology at the University of Kansas School of Medicine.

In July 2015, Li was named a Bloomberg Distinguished Professor at Johns Hopkins University for her accomplishments as an interdisciplinary researcher and excellence in teaching. The Bloomberg Distinguished Professorship program was established in 2013 by a gift from Michael Bloomberg. Li holds appointments in the Johns Hopkins School of Medicine’s Department of Cell Biology and the Whiting School of Engineering’s Department of Chemical and Biomolecular Engineering. In 2019, Rong Li was recruited by National University of Singapore to serve as Director of the Mechanobiology Institute.

In 2019, Li won the Sandra K. Masur Senior Leadership Award from The American Society for Cell Biology (ASCB). This award recognizes individuals for scientific achievements and a record of active leadership in mentoring women and individuals from underrepresented groups in their scientific careers. In 2024, she was elected as the ASCB president of Year 2026.

== Research ==
Rong Li is an accomplished investigator in the area of cell dynamics – the interrogation of biological function at the highest possible resolution in space and time. Li's research has entailed integrative approaches, encompassing biochemistry, genetics, quantitative imaging and fluorescence spectroscopy, mathematical modeling, quantitative genomics and proteomics.

To understand the pathways that control cell motility, tissue morphogenesis, and neuronal development, Li monitors both physical and biochemical reactions that overlap spatially and change rapidly, but occur only locally within a complex environment. Her broad goal is to understand how eukaryotic cells establish their distinct morphology and organization in order to carry out their specialized functions with applications in development and cancer. Specifically, how eukaryotic cells generate pattern through self-organization with or without environmental cues, accomplish division or motility through coordinated structural rearrangements and force production, and, when challenged with stress and roadblocks, evolve innovative solutions to main vitality and functionality. A key part of her research is exploring how the ability to evolve is built into cellular systems and how that ability gives rise to a cell's properties. Li has published several seminal papers on the impact of aneuploidy on cellular fitness, gene expression, stress adaptation, and genome instability. As aneuploidy and chromosome instability are hallmarks of cancer, her results on how aneuploidy fuels the evolution of cellular adaptation and drug resistance have direct relevance to the understanding of cancer evolution and disease progression. Li has also studied the molecular mechanisms that lead to oocyte maturation, which can contribute to “advances in the treatment of infertility and the field of regenerative medicine.”

Her early work with Andrew Murray at Harvard University provided the first insight into the genetic basis of the spindle assembly checkpoint. The paper documenting this work is one of the Nature Milestones in Cell Division. Li has subsequently made a number of significant discoveries in the area of mitotic exit control and cytokinesis. She is recognized as a leader in the study of cell polarity in the context of morphogenesis and asymmetric cell division, and has been at the forefront of using mathematical and biophysical approaches to understand cell polarity as a self-organizing, dynamical system. This advancement of quantitative and predictive understanding of cellular behavior relates to health, to learning and to human individuality, especially her research on topics such as cell polarity, asymmetric cell division, polycystic kidney disease, and adaptive evolution.

Li was one of the first to demonstrate the critical in vivo role for the Arp2/3 complex and WASP family proteins in the control of actin filament assembly, and to show through in vitro biochemistry that the Arp2/3 complex is an actin nucleator activated by WASP family members. In collaboration with Drs. Dorit Hanein, Niels Volkmann and Thomas D. Pollard, her laboratory helped determine the three-dimensional structure of the Arp2/3 complex in actin branch junctions. Li's recent work has revealed insights into the in vivo function of Arp2/3-nucleated dendritic actin network in mammalian asymmetric cell division and cell motility.

Li is one of the pioneers using state-of-the-art microscopy technologies to study aging and protein homeostasis (proteostasis), and uncovered some fundamental aspects of protein aggregation in cells. Her laboratory discovered endoplasmic reticulum (ER) and mitochondria-based retention of protein aggregates during aggregate formation and cell division and mitochondrial import of aggregation-prone proteins. Her lab also discovered that (TDP-43) protein aggregation directly occurs at ER-exit sites to impair ER-to-Golgi transport.

== Publications ==
Li has more than 140 publications, 18,000 citations in Google Scholar and an h-index of 72, with many of her papers appearing in top journals such as Cell, Nature, Science, Nature Cell Biology, Molecular Biology of the Cell, Journal of Cell Biology and the Proceedings of the National Academy of Sciences of the United States of America.

- Pubmed citations
- Google Scholar citations

=== Books and book chapters ===
- Li, R. "Actin-based chromosome movement in cell division." In Actin-based motility, Springer-London, Edited by Mary France-Carlier. In press.
- Slaughter BD, Unruh JR, Li R. "Examination of dynamic protein interactions in yeast using live-cell fluorescence fluctuation microscopy and spectroscopy." In Methods in Molecular Biology, Springer-London. In press.
- 2010, Symmetry Breaking in Biology. 1st Edition. with co-author B. Bowerman, Cold Spring Harbor Laboratory Press.
- 2010, R. Li and B. Bowerman. "Symmetry breaking in biology." In Symmetry Breaking in Biology, Cold Spring Harbor Laboratory Press. April 1, 2010.
- 2010, Slaughter BD, Smith SE, Li R. "Cell polarity in the budding yeast Saccharomyces cerevisiae." In Symmetry Breaking in Biology, Cold Spring Harbor Laboratory Press. April 1, 2010.

=== Highly cited articles ===
- 2010, N. Pavelka, G. Rancati, J. Zhu, WD. Bradford, A. Saraf, L. Florens, B.W. Sanderson, G.L. Hattem, R. Li. Aneuploidy confers quantitative proteome changes and phenotypic variation in budding yeast, in: Nature. Vol. 468, nº 7321; 321–325.
- 2008, R. Li, G.G. Gundersen. Beyond polymer polarity: how the cytoskeleton builds a polarized cell, in: Nature Reviews Molecular Cell Biology. Vol. 9, nº 11; 860–873.
- 2005, O. Brandman, J.E. Ferrell, R. Li, T. Meyer. Interlinked fast and slow positive feedback loops drive reliable cell decisions, in: Science. Vol. 310, nº 5747; 496–498.
- 2003, R. Wedlich-Soldner, S. Altschuler, L. Wu, R. Li. Spontaneous cell polarization through actomyosin-based delivery of the Cdc42 GTPase, in: Science. Vol. 299, nº 5610; 1231–1235.
- 2001, T. Uruno, J. Liu, P. Zhang, Y. Fan, C. Egile, R. Li, S.C. Mueller, and X. Zhan. Activation of Arp2/3 complex-mediated actin polymerization by cortactin, in: Nature Cell Biology. Vol. 3, nº 3; 259–266.
- 1999, C. Egile, T.P. Loisel, V. Laurent, R. Li, D. Pantaloni, P.J. Sansonetti, M.F. Carlier. Activation of the CDC42 effector N-WASP by the Shigella flexneri IcsA protein promotes actin nucleation by Arp2/3 complex and bacterial actin-based motility, in: The Journal of Cell Biology. Vol. 146, nº 6; 1319–1332.
- 1998, with J. Lippincott. Sequential assembly of myosin II, an IQGAP-like protein, and filamentous actin to a ring structure involved in budding yeast cytokinesis, in: The Journal of Cell Biology. Vol. 140, nº 2; 355–366.
- 1991, R. Li, A.W. Murray. Feedback control of mitosis in budding yeast, in: Cell. Vol. 66, nº 3; 519–531.

== See also ==
- Cell biology
- Arp2/3 complex
- Johns Hopkins School of Medicine
- Whiting School of Engineering
- Bloomberg Distinguished Professorships
