= Stephen L. Morgan =

American sociologist (born 1971)

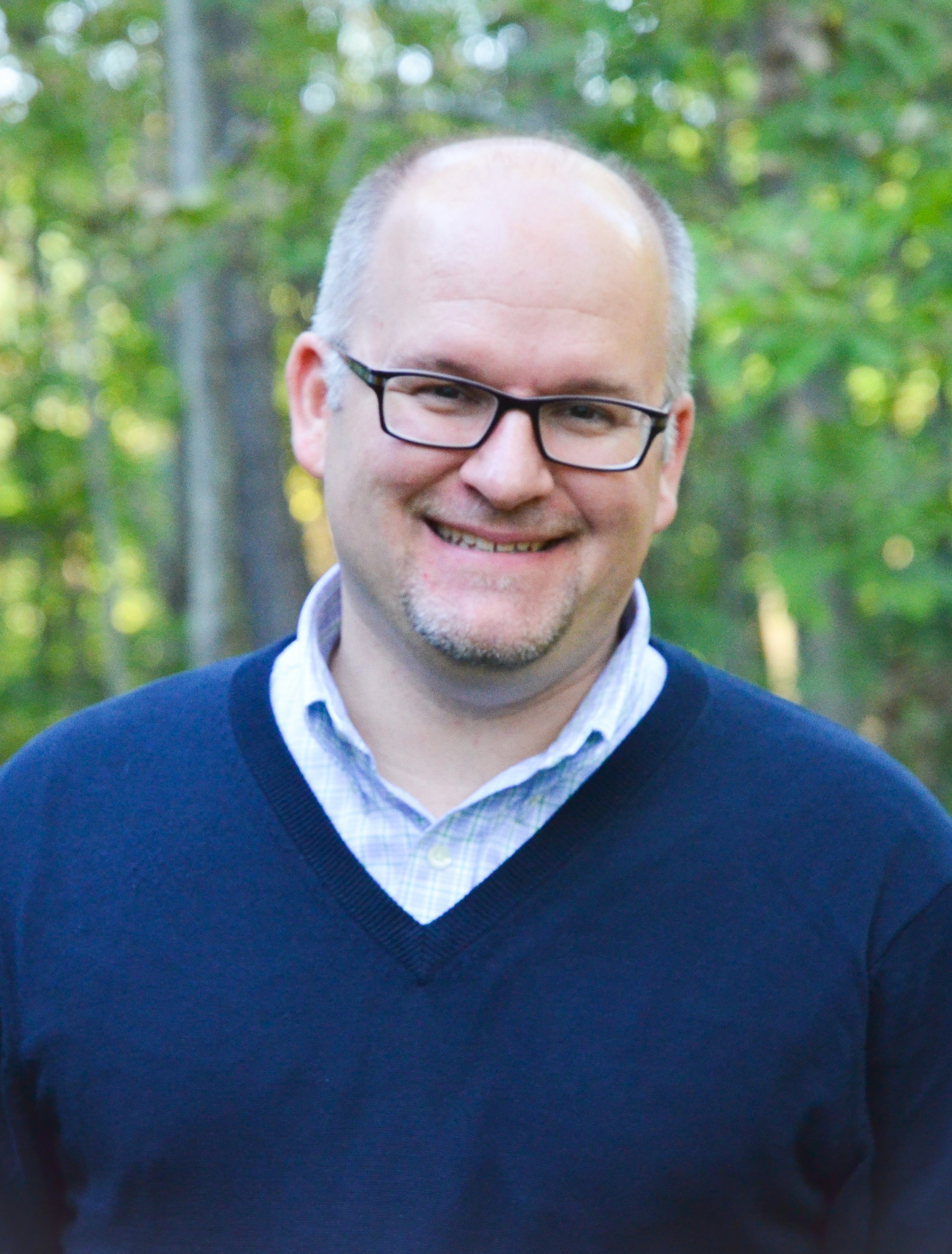
- Born: United States
- Education: Harvard University (A.B., M.A., Ph.D.); Oxford University (M.Phil.)
- Known for: Sociological Methodology; Education; Causality; Social stratification Policy Evaluation; Counterfactuals
- Awards: Bloomberg Distinguished Professorships (2014); Leo Goodman Award (2013); Robert A. & Donna B. Paul Award for Excellence in Mentoring and Advising (2011)
- Scientific career
- Fields: Sociology; Education
- Workplaces: Johns Hopkins University

Stephen Lawrence Morgan (born 1971) is a Bloomberg Distinguished Professor of Sociology and Education at the Johns Hopkins University School of Arts and Sciences and Johns Hopkins School of Education. A quantitative methodologist, he is known for his contributions to quantitative methods in sociology as applied to research on schools, particularly in models for educational attainment, improving the study of causal relationships, and his empirical research focusing on social inequality and education in the United States.

== Biography ==
Stephen "Steve" Morgan graduated summa cum laude with a Bachelor of Arts degree in sociology from Harvard University in 1993. He then spent two years on a Rhodes Scholarship at Oxford University earning a Masters of Philosophy in Comparative Social Research in 1995 before returning to Harvard to complete a Masters of Arts in sociology and a Ph.D. in sociology in 2000. Morgan joined the faculty of Cornell University as an assistant professor of sociology in 2000. He rose to the associate rank in 2003 and to a full professorship in 2009. During this time, Morgan also directed the Center for the Study of Inequality and was awarded a Provost's Award for Distinguished Scholarship "for his work on class and mobility, using advanced modeling techniques." He was also awarded Cornell's 2010-2011 Robert A. & Donna B. Paul Award for Excellence in Mentoring and Advising for "demonstrated exceptional effectiveness as an advisor and/or mentor of undergraduates." In 2012, he was named the Jan Rock Zubrow '77 Professor in the Social Sciences and became the director of graduate studies for the field of sociology.

In June 2014, Morgan was named a Bloomberg Distinguished Professor at Johns Hopkins University for his accomplishments as an interdisciplinary researcher and excellence in teaching. The Bloomberg Distinguished Professorship program was established in 2013 by a gift from Michael Bloomberg. Morgan holds joint appointments in the Johns Hopkins School of Education and the Johns Hopkins University School of Arts and Sciences's Department of Sociology.

He is an elected member of the Sociological Research Association (2009) and an elected fellow of the Society for Sociological Science (2014). He is also a member of the American Sociological Association and Population Association of America, and secretary of the Society for Sociological Science. In 2013, Morgan received the American Sociological Association Section on Methodology's Leo Goodman Award, which recognized Morgan for "contributions to sociological methodology or innovative uses of sociological methodology made by a scholar who is no more than fifteen years past the doctorate."

== Research ==
Stephen Morgan is a distinguished scholar in the area of the sociology of education whose quantitatively-oriented research spans from racial differences in educational attainment to wealth and inequality in the United States. His cross-disciplinary scholarship centers on three interrelated themes: models of achievement and attainment in the sociology of education; models of labor market and wealth inequality in social stratification; and, counterfactual models of causality in quantitative methodology.

Morgan has taught graduate courses on topics such as linear methods, social inequality, and the demography of education and inequality. His undergraduate teaching has included courses on controversies about inequality and the economic sociology of earnings. At Johns Hopkins, he is teaching an undergraduate course on schooling, racial inequality, and public policy in America, and a graduate course on causal inference.

=== Models of achievement and attainment ===
Morgan's research in this area has centered on racial differences in educational achievement and attainment. His early studies addressed black-white differences in the construction of educational expectations and the formation of alternative student identities, which set the stage for a decade long effort to synthesize the differing perspectives of sociologists and economists on the mechanisms that generate differential student achievement. This work has undertaken to integrate socialization-based models in sociology and rational-choice-based models in economics.

In his 2005 volume, On the Edge of Commitment: Educational Attainment and Race in the United States, he introduced a stochastic decisions tree model to formalize the modeling of students' beliefs and the commitment behavior that follows from them. More recently, he has applied this line of research in a project that centers on the coding of verbatim responses to occupational plans questions of approximately 13,000 students across three points in time, 2002–2006. Papers resulting from that work demonstrate how uncertainty and inaccuracy of students' beliefs predict commitment-related behavior in high school, and then bear upon academic achievement and subsequent patterns of college entry. These studies provide empirical support for the models laid out in his 2005 book, now characterized as "stutter-step models" of performance and choice.

Recent extensions include a focus on college entry processes and trajectories of performance in college, with a paper on gender differences in the selection of first major. Another extension examines the experience of immigrant children and their college persistence and completion patterns.

=== Studies of earnings, wealth, and changes in inequality ===
Morgan has written a series of papers that evaluate whether selective rent-destruction is a plausible explanation for recent increases in earnings inequality in the United States. This work uses the concept of "rent" to specify the structural advantages inherent in labor market positions, both as workers' rent paid out in wages that exceed counterfactual competitive equilibrium wages and as owners' rent paid out in stock purchase and incentive bonus schemes beyond base compensation. Among the results of this work are conclusions that implicate how structural changes in the economy have altered the ways in which rents are distributed to workers of different types. Morgan's studies also have evaluated consequences of the recent growth of inequality, one of which finds little evidence that the growth of earnings inequality has triggered sympathetic growth in inequality of educational attainment.

=== Quantitative methodology ===
Stephen Morgan's empirical studies have explored a logic of inference appropriate to the social sciences. His 2007 volume with Christopher Winship, Counterfactuals and Causal Inference: Methods and Principles for Social Research, was unique in both synthesizing and integrating the literature from sociology, statistics, and econometrics on counterfactual models in causal analysis in sociology. Morgan's other contributions to the logic and methods of causal inference in social research include research on diagnostic routines for detecting heterogeneity in causal effect estimates and applications of the causal graph methodology, including applications to the tradition of educational transitions modeling and to experimental data in survey research.

== Awards ==
- 2009 Elected Member, Sociological Research Association
- 2011 Robert A. & Donna B. Paul Award for Excellence in Mentoring and Advising
- 2013 Leo Goodman Award, American Sociological Association
- 2014 Elected Fellow, Society for Sociological Science
- 2014 Named Bloomberg Distinguished Professor

== Publications ==
Stephen Morgan has been published in top-tier journals for sociological research and has been cited more than 10,000 times in the academic literature.

=== Books ===
- 2005, On the Edge of Commitment: Educational Attainment and Race in the United States. Stanford University Press.
- 2007, Counterfactuals and Causal Inference: Methods and Principles for Social Research. with co-author Christopher Winship, Cambridge University Press.
- 2015, Counterfactuals and Causal Inference: Methods and Principles for Social Research. with co-author Christopher Winship, Second Edition, Cambridge University Press.

=== Highly cited articles ===
- 1998, Adolescent Educational Expectations: Rationalized, Fantasized, or Both?, in: Rationality and Society. Vol. 10; 131–162.
- 1999, with Christopher Winship, The estimation of causal effects from observational data inference, in: Annual Review of Sociology. Vol. 25; 659–706.
- 1999, with Aage Sørensen, Parental networks, social closure, and mathematics learning: A test of Coleman's social capital explanation of school effects, in: American Sociological Review. Vol. 64; 661–681.
- 2001, Counterfactuals, Causal Effect Heterogeneity, and the Catholic School Effect on Learning, in: Sociology of Education. Vol. 74; 341–374.
- 2006, with David Harding, Matching Estimators of Causal Effects: Prospects and Pitfalls in Theory and Practice, in: Sociological Methods & Research. Vol. 35; 3-60.
- 2008, with Jennifer J. Todd, A Diagnostic Routine for the Detection of Consequential Heterogeneity of Causal Effects, in Sociological Methodology. Vol. 38; 231–281.
- 2013, with Dafna Gelbgiser, Kim A. Weeden, Feeding the Pipeline: Gender, Occupational Plans, and College Major Selection, in Social Science Research. Vol. 42; 989–1005.
- 2018, with DJ Benjamin, JO Berger, M Johannesson, BA Nosek, EJ Wagenmakers, et al., Redefine statistical significance, in: Nature human behaviour. Vol. 2, nº 1; 6–10.

== See also ==
- Sociological Methodology
- Demography
- Social stratification
- Education
- Causality
- Structural change
- Counterfactuals
