= Lisa Cooper =

American physician (born 1963)

Lisa A. Cooper
- Born: April 12, 1963 (age 63)
- Education: Emory University (B.A., 1984); University of North Carolina (M.D., 1988); Johns Hopkins University (M.P.H., 1993)
- Awards: MacArthur Fellows Program; Bloomberg Distinguished Professorship
- Scientific career
- Fields: Public health
- Workplaces: Johns Hopkins University

Lisa A. Cooper (born April 12, 1963) is an American internal medicine and public health physician who is the Bloomberg Distinguished Professor of Equity in Health and Healthcare at Johns Hopkins University, jointly appointed in the Johns Hopkins School of Medicine, Johns Hopkins School of Nursing and in the departments of Health, Behavior and Society, Health Policy and Management; Epidemiology; and International Health in the Johns Hopkins Bloomberg School of Public Health. She is the James F. Fries Professor of Medicine in the Division of General Internal Medicine, Director of the Johns Hopkins Center for Health Equity, and Director of the Johns Hopkins Urban Health Institute. Cooper is also a Gilman Scholar and a core faculty member in the Welch Center for Prevention, Epidemiology, and Clinical Research. She is internationally recognized for her research on the impact of race, ethnicity and gender on the patient-physician relationship and subsequent health disparities. She is a member of the President’s Council of Advisors on Science and Technology (PCAST). In 2007, she received a MacArthur Fellowship.

== Early life and education ==
Cooper was born in Liberia, West Africa, to a mother who is a librarian, and a physician father. She attended the American Cooperative School in Liberia until tenth grade, and the International School of Geneva, in Switzerland, for her last two years of high school before moving to the United States to attend college. She graduated from Emory University with a B.A. in chemistry in 1984 and from the University of North Carolina at Chapel Hill School of Medicine with an M.D., in 1988. After completing her internship and residency in internal medicine at the University of Maryland Medical System, she became board certified by the American Board of Internal Medicine in 1991. She then went to Johns Hopkins University, where she obtained an M.P.H. in 1993. There, she completed a general internal medicine fellowship the following year before joining the university faculty.

== Career ==
In 2011, Governor Martin O'Malley created the Maryland Health Care Quality and Costs Council through an executive order, and Cooper was appointed as co-chair of its Cultural Competency Workgroup. Cooper has testified in congressional hearings in support of funding for health disparities research, equity in healthcare delivery, and diversity and inclusion in the healthcare workforce. In 2019, Cooper testified at the Energy and Commerce Committee hearing on "Investing in America's Healthcare" in support of reauthorizing the Patient-Centered Outcomes Research Institute (PCORI). In 2021, President Joe Biden appointed Cooper to the President's Council of Advisors on Science and Technology (PCAST). The Council advises the president on developments related to science, innovation, and technology, including health and medicine, helping inform evidence-based decisions.

Cooper is the founder and director of the Johns Hopkins Center for Health Equity (originally called the Johns Hopkins Center to Eliminate Cardiovascular Health Disparities). The Center, established in 2010, uses a comprehensive strategy to promote equity in health and health care for vulnerable populations.

Cooper was appointed as the director of the UHI in April 2020, just as racial disparities in infections, hospitalizations, and deaths from the novel coronavirus were becoming more evident in the US.

== Research ==
Cooper’s research has focused on the physician-patient relationship and how race and ethnicity factor into the quality of patient care. The interventions she has tested include patient-centered strategies to overcome racial and ethnic disparities in healthcare. She has pioneered approaches for reducing healthcare disparities among minority populations through culturally tailored education programs and patient-centered communication training. Her most highly cited paper is a 1999 article in the Journal of the American Medical Association (JAMA) that analyzed the role race plays in the patient-physician relationship. The study demonstrated that minority patients found that their physicians involved them in the decision-making process at lower levels than non-minorities did, and that patients seeing physicians of their own race also rated the decision-making process as more participatory than patients seeing physicians of another race. The first of its kind, this study revealed that differences in the relationship between the patient and physician may be a key factor underlying the already established inequitable quality of health care based on a person's race and ethnicity. Cooper’s research contributed greatly to two paradigm shifts in healthcare research: patient-centeredness and health disparities. Her research documented the existence of disparities in the quality of medical communication experienced by African Americans and other ethnic minorities compared to whites, and the contribution of implicit racial bias and stereotyping behaviors among physicians to poorer communication in the visits of African American patients. Her interventions have identified the important role of patient activation and engagement in treatment decisions in reducing disparities in health care quality for chronic conditions.

== Awards ==
- 2005 Election to the American Society of Clinical Investigation
- 2007 MacArthur Fellows Program
- 2008 Election to the National Academy of Medicine
- 2009 Named Fellow of the American College of Physicians
- 2014 Election to the Association of American Physicians
- 2014 Herbert W. Nickens Award by the Association of American Medical Colleges (AAMC)
- 2015 Senior Fellow, W. Montague Cobb Health Institute, National Medical Association
- 2017 Helen Rodriguez-Trìas Social Justice Award by the American Public Health Association

== Publications ==
Cooper has published more than 200 peer-reviewed articles in top journals, including JAMA, Annals of Internal Medicine the American Journal of Epidemiology, the American Journal of Public Health, Medical Care, and the Journal of General Internal Medicine. She has an h-index of 82. She was named "Highly Cited" by Thomson Reuters in 2014 and 2015.

=== Books ===
- Why Are Health Disparities Everyone's Problem?, Johns Hopkins University Press 2021

=== Highly Cited Articles ===
- 2012, LA Cooper, DL Roter, KA Carson, MC Beach, JA Sabin, AG Greenwald, TS Inui. The associations of clinicians' implicit attitudes about race with medical visit communication and patient ratings of interpersonal care in American Journal of Public Health. Vol 102 nº5, 979-987. doi:10.2105/AJPH.2011.300558
- 2004, RL Johnson, D Roter, NR Powe, and LA Cooper, Patient race/ethnicity and quality of patient-physician communication during medical visits, in American Journal of Public Health. Vol. 94 nº12, 2084-2090.
- 2003, LE Boulware, LA Cooper, LE Ratner, TA LaVeist, and NR Powe, Race and trust in the leath care system, in Public Health Reports. Vol. 118 nº4, 358-365.
- 2005, MC Beach, EG Price, TL Gary, KA Robinson, A Gozu, A Palacio, C Smarth, MW Jenckes, C Feuerstein, EB Bass, NR Powe, LA Cooper, Cultural competence: a systematic review of health care provider educational interventions, in Medical Care. Vol. 43 nº4, 356-373.
- 2003, LA Cooper, DL Roter, RL Johnson, DE Ford, DM Steinwachs, NR Powe, Patient-centered communication, ratings of care, and concordance of patient and physician race. Vol. 139 nº11, 907-915.
- 1999, L Cooper-Patrick, JJ Gallo, JJ Gonzales, HT Vu, NR Powe, C Nelson, DE Ford, Race, gender, and partnership in the patient-physician relationship, in JAMA, Vol. 282 nº6, 583-589.
