= Christopher Cannon =

Chris or Christopher Cannon may refer to:

- Chris Cannon (1950–2024), American politician
- Christopher Cannon (medievalist) (born 1965), American academic
- King Kong Bundy (1955–2019), American professional wrestler known as Chris Cannon in his early career
