= Silene gazulensis =

Conservation status
- Critically Endangered (IUCN 3.1)

Scientific classification
- Kingdom: Plantae
- Clade: Tracheophytes
- Clade: Angiosperms
- Clade: Eudicots
- Order: Caryophyllales
- Family: Caryophyllaceae
- Genus: Silene
- Species: S. gazulensis

Binomial name
- Silene gazulensis A.Galán de Mera, J.E.Cortés, J.A.Vicente Orellana & R.Morales Alonso

Species of flowering plant

Silene gazulensis is a species of plant in the family Caryophyllaceae. It is endemic to Cádiz, Spain. Its natural habitat is rocky areas. It is threatened by habitat loss. This rare cushion-forming plant produces delicate white flowers that bloom among the limestone rocks of southern Spain. Known locally as the Gazules campion, it forms small mounded clusters rarely exceeding 10 cm in height, with its woolly, spoon-shaped leaves arranged in rosettes that help it survive in its harsh rocky habitat.

== Description ==
Silene gazulensis is a low, cushion-forming perennial herb (hemicryptophyte) that rarely exceeds 10 cm in height. Its stems are woody and bear scars from previous seasons' leaves, while most foliage arises in a basal rosette. The leaves are spoon-shaped to narrowly lance-shaped, measuring 20–70 mm long and 6–16 mm wide, and are densely tomentose (covered in matted, woolly hairs) with non-glandular hairs up to 0.3 mm long on the blade and 0.7 mm on the petiole.

Flowering stems (scapes) reach up to 6 cm and terminate in a tightly contracted panicle bearing 6–11 flowers, each subtended by lanceolate bracts (5–11 mm) and smaller bracteoles (4–8 mm). Individual flowers are borne on very short pedicels of 1–3 mm. The calyx at anthesis is a slender cylinder 15–20 mm long and 4–6 mm wide, with ten prominent veins often tinged purple towards the tip. It ends in five blunt teeth, 1–1.5 mm long, edged with a membranous margin and fringed with fine hairs; the entire calyx surface bears non-glandular, verruculose (warty-surfaced) hairs up to 0.3 mm long. The corolla spans 14–20 mm in diameter and comprises five two-lobed petals that are white—occasionally flushed with pink on the reverse—each up to 10 mm long. The corolla throat is about 2.5 mm deep and bears an inconspicuous ligule. Reproductive structures include ten stamens and a green ovary topped by three white styles, all borne on a pubescent androgynophore 6–8 mm long. Fruit is an ovoid capsule (9–11 mm by 5–7 mm), matching the calyx in length. Seeds are kidney-shaped (reniform), grey, 1.1–1.5 mm long and 0.9–1.1 mm wide, laterally flattened with flat faces and a grooved, papillose (wart-covered) back.

== Taxonomy ==
Silene gazulensis was formally described in 1999 by Galán de Mera and colleagues and assigned to Silene section Siphonomorpha, a lineage of cushion-forming campions with slender, veined calyces and often woolly, non-glandular hairs. Section Siphonomorpha is centred on the western Mediterranean, where its taxa inhabit rocky, calcium-rich substrates. The species epithet gazulensis honours its type locality at Alcalá de los Gazules in Cádiz, Spain. Morphologically, S. gazulensis differs from the widespread S. andryalifolia and the Gibraltar endemic S. tomentosa by its low, pulviniform (cushion-like) growth, white petals (rather than pale violet), and a narrowly cylindrical calyx bearing verruculose (warty-surfaced) hairs without stalked glands.

Molecular analysis of the internal transcribed spacer (ITS) region of nuclear ribosomal DNA shows that S. gazulensis shares 98.2 % sequence identity with S. tomentosa and 96.7 % with S. andryalifolia, placing it squarely between these two taxa in genetic affinity. Cytogenetic comparisons also support its distinct status, with chromosome characters that reinforce its recognition as a separate species rather than a mere variant or hybrid form.
