= Health care (disambiguation) =

Health care, healthcare or medical care is the diagnosis, treatment, and prevention of disease, illness, and injury.

Health care may also refer to:

- Health care system, an organization of institutions
- Health care industry, a sector of the economy
- Health care reform, a governmental policy
- "Health Care" (The Office), an episode of The Office
- Medical Care (journal)
- Health Services constituency of Hong Kong

== See also ==
- Health, the general condition of a person's mind, body and spirit
