= Bloomberg Distinguished Professorships =

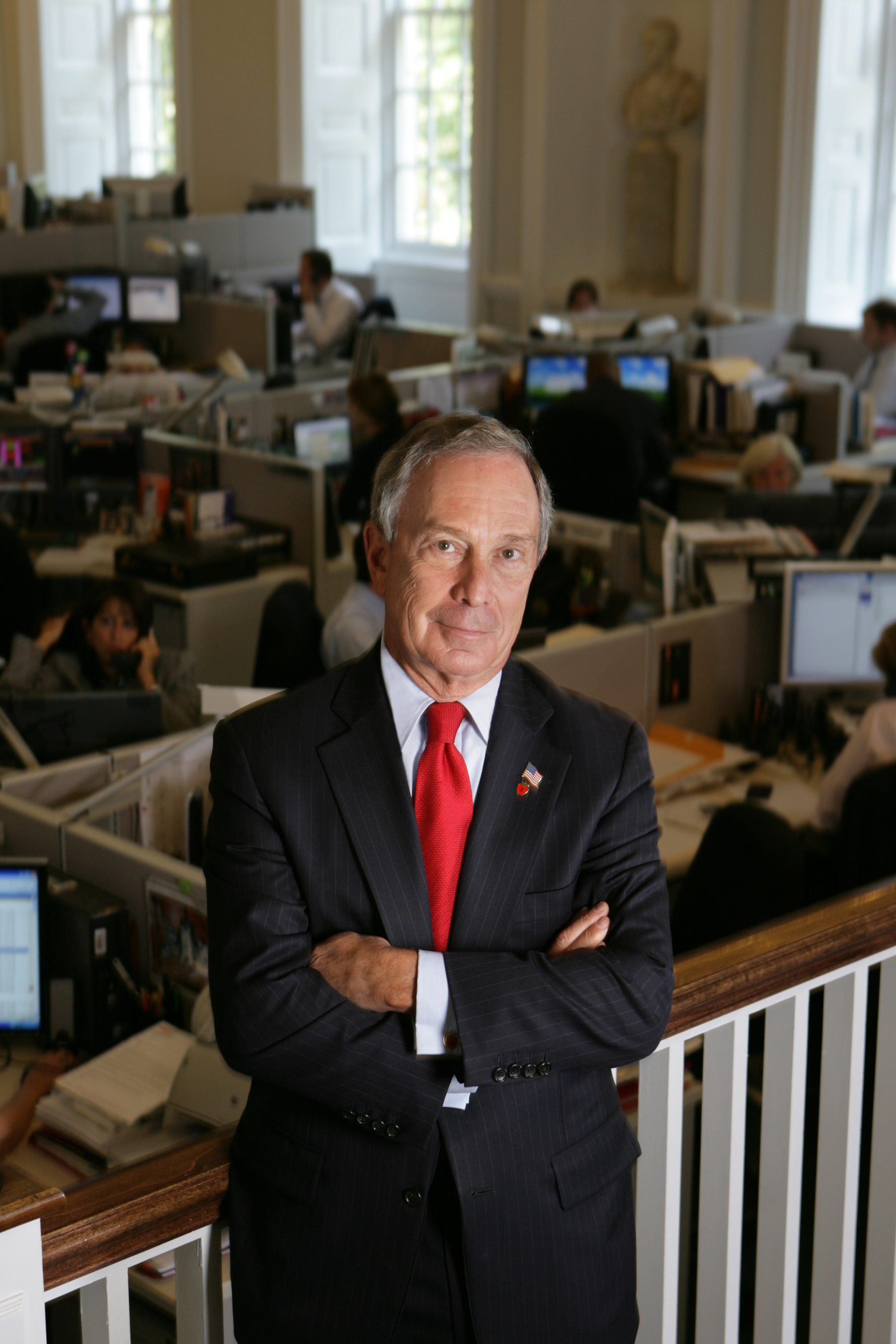
- Michael Bloomberg
- Established: 2013
- Website: bdp.jhu.edu

Bloomberg Distinguished Professorships were established as part of a $350 million investment by Michael Bloomberg, Hopkins class of 1964, to Johns Hopkins University in 2013. Fifty faculty members, ten from Johns Hopkins University and forty recruited from institutions worldwide, will be chosen for these endowed professorships based on their research, teaching, service, and leadership records. In December 2021, it was announced that the program would be doubled in size, with an additional fifty professors bringing the total to one hundred scholars, made possible by a new investment by Michael Bloomberg. With recruitment beginning in 2022, the majority of the new professors will be recruited to work in clusters. These faculty-developed interdisciplinary clusters will recruit Bloomberg Distinguished Professors and junior faculty to Johns Hopkins University with the aim of conducting transformational research in crucial areas.

The Bloomberg Distinguished Professorship program is directed and managed by Johns Hopkins University vice provost for research, Denis Wirtz. As of January 2022, 54 Bloomberg Distinguished Professorships have been announced.

== Purpose ==
The professorships will create interdisciplinary connections and collaborations across Johns Hopkins University, train and mentor undergraduate and graduate students, and strengthen the university's leadership in research fields of international interest. Each of the Bloomberg Distinguished Professors will be appointed in at least two divisions or disciplines. The program aims to bridge traditional research disciplines in order to tackle complex problems such as cancer, urban poverty, and health disparities.

== Bloomberg Distinguished Professors ==
Professor	Professorship research area	Installation year
Peter Agre	malaria	2014
Rexford S. Ahima	diabetes	2016
Nicole Baumgarth	immunology and infectious diseases	2022
James Bellingham	exploration robotics	2021
Charles L. Bennett	space, experimental astrophysics, and cosmology	2015
Otis Brawley	oncology and epidemiology	2019
Melinda Buntin	health policy and economics	2023
Filipe Campante	political economy and governance	2018
Christopher Cannon	medieval literature and culture	2017
Jane Carlton	malaria genomics and global public health	2024
Arturo Casadevall	molecular microbiology and immunology, infectious diseases	2015
Nilanjan Chatterjee	biostatistics and genetic epidemiology	2015
Rama Chellappa	computer vision and machine learning	2020
Kris Chesky	performing arts health	2023
Christopher G. Chute	health informatics	2015
Jeffery Coller	RNA biology and therapeutics	2020
Lisa Cooper	health equity	2016
Derek Cummings	infectious disease dynamics	2025
Chi Van Dang	cancer medicine	2022
David DeMille	atomic/molecular physics and precision measurement	2025
Mikala Egeblad	tumor microenvironment	2023
Andrew Feinberg	epigenetics	2015
Paul Ferraro	human behavior and public policy	2015
Domenico Giannone	economics and statistics	2025
Jessica Gill	trauma recovery biomarkers	2021
Rachel Green	biology and genetics	2017
Gillian Hadfield	AI alignment and governance	2025
Yuan He	structural biophysics and chromatin biology	2025
Ive Hermans	sustainable chemical transformations	2026
Richard L. Huganir	neuroscience and brain sciences	2018
Theodore Jack Iwashyna	social science and justice in medicine	2023
Lawrence Jackson	English and history	2017
Patricia Janak	associative learning and addiction	2014
Odis Johnson	social policy and STEM equity	2021
Daniel Kammen	energy transition and climate justice	2025
Yannís G. Kevrekidis	modeling and dynamic behavior of complex systems	2017
Daeyeol Lee	neuroeconomics	2019
Julie Lundquist	atmospheric science and wind energy	2024
Ellen MacKenzie	traumatic injury and rehabilitation health services	2017
Mauro Maggioni	data-intensive computation	2016
Kathryn McDonald	health systems, quality, and safety	2020
Ebony McGee	innovation and inclusion in the STEM ecosystem	2024
Ilya Monosov	curiosity and intelligence	2026
Stephen L. Morgan	sociology and education	2014
Ulrich Mueller	hearing loss and brain development	2016
Edward Pearce	immunobiology	2020
Eliana Perrin	primary care	2021
Erika Pearce	immunology and cellular metabolism	2020
Hanna Pickard	philosophy and bioethics	2019
Ian Phillips	philosophy, psychological and brain sciences	2019
Daniel Polsky	health economics	2019
Monica Prasad	economic and political sociology	2023
Adam Riess	observational cosmology and dark energy	2016
Bhaven Sampat	science and innovation policy	2026
Kathleen M. Sutcliffe	organizational theory and patient safety	2014
Steven Salzberg	computational biology and genomics	2015
Michael Schatz	computational biology and oncology	2016
Jeremy Shiffman	global health policy	2018
David Sing	exoplanetary physics	2018
Sabine Stanley	planetary physics	2017
Alex Szalay	big data	2015
Michael Tsapatsis	nanomaterials	2018
Benjamin Wandelt	cosmology and scientific AI	2026
Vesla Weaver	racial politics and criminal justice	2017
Ashani Weeraratna	cancer biology	2019
Carl Wu	chromatin biology and biochemistry	2016
Younan Xia	nanoscience and nanotechnology	2026
Alan Yuille	computational cognitive science	2015

=== Former Bloomberg Distinguished Professors ===
Professor	Professorship research area	Years active
Kathryn Edin	inequality and social policy	2014–2018
Carol W. Greider	molecular biology	2014–2020
Jessica Fanzo	global food and agriculture ethics and policy	2015–2023
Taekjip Ha	Single-molecule biophysics	2015–2023
Matthew Kahn	economics and business	2019–2021
Rong Li	cell dynamics	2015–2022
Nilabh Shastri	immunology and pathogenesis	2018–2020

== Clusters ==
Advancing racial equity in health, housing, and education

Artificial intelligence and society

Climate, resilience, and health

Brain resilience across the lifespan

Hub for imaging and quantum technologies

Epigenome sciences

Preparing and responding to emerging pandemics

Knowledge to action and the business of health
