= Theodore John Iwashyna =

American physician-scientist

Theodore J. Iwashyna is an American physician-scientist specializing in critical care medicine. He is a Bloomberg Distinguished Professor at Johns Hopkins University and holds appointments in the Division of Pulmonary and Critical Care Medicine in the School of Medicine and the Department of Health Policy and Management in the Bloomberg School of Public Health. His research focuses on outcomes following critical illness, particularly the long-term consequences of sepsis. He has conducted research on racial disparities in medical devices, specifically pulse oximeter accuracy across different skin tones.

== Education ==
Iwashyna received his bachelor's degree in molecular biology from Princeton University, his PhD from the Harris School of Public Policy, and an MD from the Pritzker School of Medicine, University of Chicago. He completed his residency in internal medicine at the University of Pennsylvania, as well as a fellowship in pulmonary and critical care medicine.

== Career ==
Iwashyna began his faculty career at the University of Michigan School of Medicine, where he rose to the rank of professor of internal medicine. During this time, he was also co-director of the research core of the Center for Clinical Management Research at the Veteran's Administration Ann Arbor Healthcare System, and co-director of the Michigan National Clinician Scholar Program.

In 2022, Iwashyna joined Johns Hopkins University as a Bloomberg Distinguished Professor as a member of the Knowledge to Action and the Business of Health cluster. He holds appointments in the Division of Pulmonary and Critical Care Medicine in the School of Medicine and the Department of Health Policy and Management in the Bloomberg School of Public Health, with a courtesy appointment in the Carey Business School.

== Research ==
Iwashyna's research examines the outcomes of critical illness, with a particular emphasis on what happens to patients after they survive intensive care unit (ICU) hospitalization. His research on post-intensive care syndrome has documented new cognitive impairment and functional disability among survivors of severe sepsis.

Iwashyna has conducted research examining racial disparities in pulse oximeter accuracy. This work documented that Black patients had nearly three times the frequency of low blood oxygen levels not detected by pulse oximetry compared to white patients. Iwashyna has advocated for regulatory action to address these disparities, including post-market surveillance data to help with enforcement of U.S. Food and Drug Administration (FDA) guidelines.

During the COVID-19 pandemic, Iwashyna treated COVID-19 patients in the ICU, and helped develop the COVID-19 unit at the University of Michigan and the Department of Veteran Affairs Ann Arbor Healthcare System. He worked with ethicists and political scientists to help develop practical approaches to reduce inequity if rationing had been necessary. He also conducted research on the clinical characteristics and outcomes of patients with COVID-19. Research topics included safety of oxygen delivery devices, quality of life, physical function, and psychological consequences of severe COVID-19; continuing symptoms, disability, and financial consequences after hospitalization; and readmission and death after initial hospital discharge. He also developed a model to train and deploy medical students as respiratory therapists to address the respiratory therapist shortage during the pandemic. He argued in an opinion piece in the New York Times that large academic medical centers had an opportunity and an obligation to find ways to centralize the care of COVID-19 patients with acute respiratory failure, and should accept transfers of severely ill patients from smaller community hospitals despite financial pressures resulting from the pandemic.

Iwashyna has advocated against proposed cuts to National Institutes of Health funding. He has argued that the cuts, including capping indirect cost reimbursement, would harm the staff, facilities, and administrative infrastructure necessary to conduct biomedical research—thereby harming the health of future patients and hurting the economy.

== Awards ==
- 2016 - Fellow, American College of Critical Care Medicine
- 2018 - Sepsis Alliance "Sepsis Hero"
- 2018 - Member, American Society for Clinical Investigation (ASCI)
- 2021 - Distinguished Mentor Award (MICHR, University of Michigan CTSA)
- 2024 - Member, Association of American Physicians
- 2025 - Extraordinary Achievement Award, American Thoracic Society Assembly on Critical Care
- 2025 - STATus List, Stat News

== Publications ==
Iwashyna has authored or co-authored more than 450 peer-reviewed articles as of 2026 in journals including The New England Journal of Medicine, JAMA, The Lancet, and American Journal of Respiratory and Critical Care Medicine. In July 2026, he became a regular contributor to NEJM Voices.

=== Selected Publications ===
- Iwashyna, T. J.; Ely, E. W.; Smith, D. M.; Langa, K. M. (2010). "Long-term cognitive impairment and functional disability among survivors of severe sepsis". JAMA. 304 (16): 1787–1794. Bibcode:2010JAMA..304.1787I. doi:10.1001/jama.2010.1553. PMC 3345288. PMID 20978258.
- Sjoding, M. W.; Dickson, R. P.; Iwashyna, T. J.; Gay, S. E.; Valley, T. S. (2020). "Racial Bias in Pulse Oximetry Measurement". The New England Journal of Medicine. 383 (25): 2477–2478. doi:10.1056/NEJMc2029240. PMC 7808260. PMID 33326721.
- "Early Neuromuscular Blockade in the Acute Respiratory Distress Syndrome". The New England Journal of Medicine. 380 (21): 1997–2008. 2019. doi:10.1056/NEJMoa1901686. PMC 6741345. PMID 31112383.
- Prescott, H. C.; Osterholzer, J. J.; Langa, K. M.; Angus, D. C.; Iwashyna, T. J. (2016). "Late mortality after sepsis: Propensity matched cohort study". BMJ (Clinical Research Ed.). 353 i2375. doi:10.1136/bmj.i2375. PMC 4869794. PMID 27189000.
- Iwashyna, T. J.; Netzer, G.; Langa, K. M.; Cigolle, C. (2012). "Spurious inferences about long-term outcomes: The case of severe sepsis and geriatric conditions". American Journal of Respiratory and Critical Care Medicine. 185 (8): 835–841. doi:10.1164/rccm.201109-1660OC. PMC 3360570. PMID 22323301.
