= Michael Tsapatsis =

American chemical engineer and materials scientist

Bloomberg Distinguished Professor Michael Tsapatsis
- Born: 1965 (age 60–61); Greece
- Education: University of Patras, Greece (1988); California Institute of Technology (M.S. 1991, Ph.D. 1994)
- Known for: Zeolite Synthesis; Separations; Catalysis
- Awards: Breck Award, 2013; Alpha Chi Sigma Award, 2013; National Academy of Engineering (2015)
- Scientific career
- Fields: Chemical engineering, Materials science
- Workplaces: University of Massachusetts Amherst; University of Minnesota; Johns Hopkins University
- Doctoral advisors: G.R. Gavalas; Mark E. Davis

Michael Tsapatsis (born 1965, Athens, Greece) is an American chemical engineer and materials scientist. Tsapatsis is the 36th Bloomberg Distinguished Professor at Johns Hopkins University in the Department of Chemical and Biomolecular Engineering. Prior to this position he was the Amundson Chair (2008–present), professor (2003-present), and McKnight Presidential Endowed Chair (2017–present) in the department of chemical engineering and Materials Science at the University of Minnesota. Prior to his appointment at the University of Minnesota, Tsapatsis was an associate professor at the University of Massachusetts Amherst.

He is well-recognized for his wide-ranging research in zeolite synthesis, especially his contributions to the design of hierarchical zeolite structures and their applications in catalysis and membrane separations. According to Web of Science, he has produced over 250 published works that have been cited over 12,500 times, with an h-index of 62 as of February 23, 2018. He was elected to the National Academy of Engineering in 2015.

== Early life and education ==
Michael Tsapatsis was born in 1965 in Athens, Greece. He received his diploma in chemical engineering at the University of Patras, Greece, in 1988. Working under the supervision of G.R. Gavalas at the California Institute of Technology, Tsapatsis received his M.S. in chemical engineering in 1991 and his Ph.D. in chemical engineering in 1994. His dissertation was titled "Composite inorganic membranes for gas separations: Chemical vapor deposition of hydrogen permselective oxide membranes and preparation of supported zeolite NaA films." Tsapatsis completed post-doctoral training with Mark E. Davis at the California Institute of Technology. He subsequently joined the faculty at the University of Massachusetts Amherst in 1994. Tsapatsis and his wife, Efrosini, have two children.

== Contributions to chemical engineering ==
Tsapatsis is internationally recognized for his outstanding contributions and achievements as a chemical engineer. From his early work as an assistant professor at the University of Massachusetts up to recent research at the University of Minnesota, he has broadly studied the preparation of zeolite films as membranes for molecular separation. Over a decade of work addressing the challenge of disintegration of fabricated sheets eventually led to multiple discoveries allowing for the preparation of "layered nanosheets" that are just a few silicon atoms thick. Fundamental research alongside engineering and process development has led to advances in separation with membranes for applications including xylene separation, biofuels purification, and sour gas cleaning.

Tsapatsis has also developed hierarchical zeolite particles with unique properties of value to chemical properties that utilize adsorption and catalysis. In 2011, he discovered a synthesis method for preparing nanosheets of microporous materials that could be organized as sheets for filtration application. In 2012, Tsapatsis led a team of researchers to develop a hierarchical zeolite nanoparticle called Self-Pillared Pentasil (SPP). Consisting of nanoscale pores, SPP was characterized and shown to have tunable properties similar to conventional zeolites used in gas separation and fuel refining, but with integrated large pores (mesopores) which provided enhanced diffusion capability for molecular transport.

The breadth of his accomplishments extends beyond zeolite synthesis to applications in structured catalysts, oriented molecular sieve films, and molecular sieve/polymer nanocomposites for membrane applications, as well as for adsorbents for commercial cleaning processes. He has been part of catalysis research teams that have developed new processes to prepare renewable chemicals including isoprene, p-xylene, and bio-derived surfactants. His zeolites have also been selected for enhancing existing applications, including energy-demanding processes such as ethanol dehydration.

== Awards, honors, and professional service ==
For his outstanding research and education efforts, Tsapatsis has received numerous awards, including:

- 2017 McKnight Presidential Endowed Chair
- 2013 Breck Award from the International Zeolite Association
- 2013 Alpha Chi Sigma Award from the American Institute of Chemical Engineering
- 2008 George W. Taylor Award for Distinguished Research
- 2007 Charles M.A. Stine Award from the American Institute of Chemical Engineering
- 1998 Outstanding Junior Faculty Award from the University of Massachusetts Amherst
- 1998 Camille Dreyfus Teacher-Scholar Award
- 1996 David and Lucile Packard Fellowship for Science and Engineering
- 1996 NSF CAREER Award from the National Science Foundation

In addition to being elected a member of the National Academy of Engineering in 2015, he is also a fellow of the American Association for the Advancement of Science and in 2013 was elected a council member of the International Zeolite Association.

Tsapatsis is well known for his expertise in zeolite synthesis, with invitations to present over 150 lectures including the Dow Lecture (Rice University), the ExxonMobil Lecture (UMass Amherst), the S.V. Sotirchos Lecture (Foundation for Research & Technology – Hellas), and the G.C.A. Schuit Lectures (University of Delaware). Additionally, Tsapatsis has served the broader scientific community as an editor for the journal Microporous and Mesoporous Materials, the official journal of the International Zeolite Association. He is also a member of the editorial board for the journal Annual Review of Chemical and Biomolecular Engineering, and an advisory board member of Industrial and Engineering Chemistry Research.

== Key publications ==
Michael Tsapatsis has more than 23,000 citations in Google Scholar and an h-index of 96. Tsapatsis has authored numerous journal articles describing significant advances in zeolite synthesis, materials science, and chemical engineering, which include but are not limited to:

- M.C. Lovallo, M. Tsapatsis, "Preferentially Oriented Submicron Silicalite Membranes", AIChE Journal, 42, 3020–3029, (1996).
- S.M. Kuznicki, V.A. Bell, S. Nair, H.W. Hillhouse, R.M. Jacubinas, C.M. Braunbarth, B.H. Toby, M. Tsapatsis, "A titanosilicate molecular sieve with adjustable pores for size-selective adsorption of molecules", Nature, 412, 720–724, (2001).
- Z. Lai, G. Bonilla, I. Diaz, J.G. Nery, K. Sujaoti, M.A. Amat, E. Kokkoli, O. Terasaki, R.W. Thompson, M. Tsapatsis, D.G. Vlachos, "Microstructural Optimization of Zeolite Membrane for Organic Vapor Separation", Science 300, 456–460, (2003).
- T.M. Davis, T.O. Drews, H. Ramanan, C. He, J. Dong, H. Schnablegger, M.A. Katsoulakis, E. Kokkoli, A.V. McCormick, R.L. Penn, M. Tsapatsis, "Mechanistic Principles of Nanoparticle Evolution to Zeolite Crystals", Nature Materials 5, 400, (2006).
- W. Fan, M.A. Snyder, S. Kumar, P.S. Lee, W.C. Yoo, A.V. McCormick, R.L. Penn, A. Stein, M. Tsapatsis, "Hierarchical nanofabrication of microporous crystals with ordered mesoporosity", Nature Materials 7, 984, (2008).
- K. Varoon, X. Zhang, B. Elyassi, D.D. Brewer, M. Gettel, S. Kumar, J.A. Lee, S. Maheshwari, A. Mittal, C.Y. Sung, M. Cococcioni, L.F. Francis, A.V. McCormick, K.A. Mkhoyan, M. Tsapatsis, "Dispersible Exfoliated Zeolite Nanosheets and their Application as a Selective Membrane", Science 333, 72–75, (2011).
- X. Zhang, D. Liu, D. Xu, S. Asahina, K.A. Cychosz, K.V. Agrawal, Y. Al Wahedi, A. Bhan, S. Al Hashimi, O. Terasaki, M. Thommes, M. Tsapatsis, "Synthesis of Self-Pillared Zeolite Nanosheets by Repetitive Branching", Science 336, 1684, (2012).
- Mi Young Jeon, Donghun Kim, Prashant Kumar, Pyung Soo Lee, Neel Rangnekar, Peng Bai, Meera Shete, Bahman Elyassi, Han Seung Lee, Katabathini Narasimharao, Sulaiman Nasir Basahel, Shaeel Al-Thabaiti, Wenqian Xu, Hong Je Cho, Evgenii O Fetisov, Raghuram Thyagarajan, Robert F DeJaco, Wei Fan, K Andre Mkhoyan, J Ilja Siepmann, Michael Tsapatsis, "Ultra-Selective High-Flux Membranes from Directly Synthesized Zeolite Nanosheets", Nature 543, 690–694, (2017).
