= Julie Lundquist =

American atmospheric scientist

Julie Kay Lundquist is an American atmospheric scientist, and a Bloomberg Distinguished Professor of Atmospheric Science and Wind Energy at Johns Hopkins University. Her research combines observational data with simulation to understand the effects of weather on wind energy production and the effects of wind energy production on the behavior of the atmosphere.

== Education and career ==
Lundquist was an undergraduate at Trinity University (Texas), graduating in 1995 with a double major in English and Physics. Her interest in atmospheric science was sparked by a summer internship at the National Center for Atmospheric Research and by reading the book An Album of Fluid Motion by Milton Van Dyke. Next, she went to the University of Colorado Boulder for graduate study in the Department of Astrophysical and Planetary Sciences, supervised by William Blumen. She received a master's degree in 1997 and completed her Ph.D. in 2001.

She continued as a postdoctoral researcher at CU Boulder for another year, and then became a postdoctoral researcher at the Lawrence Livermore National Laboratory. She remained at Lawrence Livermore as a physicist in the Atmospheric, Earth, and Energy Department from 2004 to 2010. In 2010, she returned to Colorado as a Fellow in the Renewable and Sustainable Energy Institute, research scientist in the National Renewable Energy Laboratory, assistant professor in the Department of Atmospheric and Oceanic Sciences at CU Boulder, and affiliated faculty member in the Department of Applied Mathematics at CU Boulder. She was promoted to associate professor in 2016 and full professor in 2023.

In 2024 she moved to Johns Hopkins University as Bloomberg Distinguished Professor of Atmospheric Science and Wind Energy, with a joint appointment in the Department of Mechanical Engineering and the Department of Earth and Planetary Sciences.

== Recognition ==
Lundquist is a Fellow of the American Meteorological Society.
