= Major Extremity Trauma Research Consortium =

- Formation: 2009; 17 years ago
- Headquarters: Johns Hopkins Bloomberg School of Public Health
- Key people: Ellen MacKenzie (Executive Chair); Michael Bosse (Executive Chair)
- Website: https://metrc.org/

The Major Extremity Trauma Research Consortium (METRC) is a network of clinical centers centered at the Johns Hopkins Bloomberg School of Public Health conducting multicenter clinical research studies on the treatment and outcomes of traumatic orthopedic injuries.

== History ==
The Major Extremity Trauma Research Consortium (METRC), a military-civilian collaboration, was established in September 2009 with funding from the U.S. Department of Defense. Built as a network of clinical centers, the consortium conducts clinical research studies to improve the treatment and outcomes of orthopedic trauma sustained by military and civilian patients.

== Awards ==
In 2024, the PREVENT CLOT study was awarded the Distinguished Clinical Research Achievement Award by the Clinical Research Forum.

In 2023, the American Academy of Orthopaedic Surgeons (AAOS) awarded METRC the Kappa Delta Elizabeth Winston Lanier Award.
