= Alan Yuille =

English academic

Alan L. Yuille
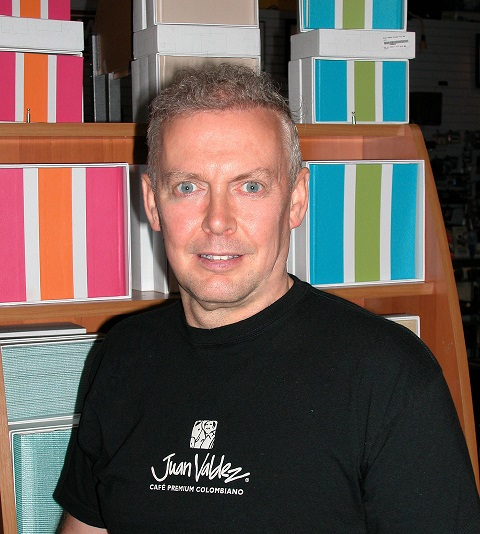
- Born: 1955 (age 70–71); London, UK
- Education: University of Cambridge (B.A., 1976); University of Cambridge (Ph.D., 1981)
- Spouse: Seyoun Park
- Scientific career
- Fields: Computer Vision; Machine Learning; Statistical Modeling; Artificial Intelligence
- Thesis: Topics in Quantum Gravity
- Doctoral advisor: S. W. Hawking
- Website: CCVL Group website

Alan Yuille (born 1955) is an English academic who ish Bloomberg Distinguished Professor of Computational Cognitive Science with appointments in the departments of Cognitive Science and Computer Science at Johns Hopkins University. Yuille develops models of vision and cognition for computers, intended for creating artificial vision systems. He studied under Stephen Hawking at Cambridge University on a PhD in theoretical physics, which he completed in 1981.

== Biography ==
Alan Yuille obtained a Bachelor of Arts degree in mathematics from the University of Cambridge in 1976, where he also earned his PhD in theoretical physics in 1981. He then completed a postdoctoral fellowship at the University of Texas at Austin and the University of California, Santa Barbara. Yuille served as a research scientist first at the Artificial Intelligence Laboratory at the Massachusetts Institute of Technology, where he stayed from 1982 until 1986, and then at Harvard University. He was promoted to assistant professor of computer science in 1988 and associate professor in 1992. In 1995, he joined the Smith-Kettlewell Eye Research Institute in San Francisco as a senior research scientist. In 2002, he was appointed as a full professor in the department of statistics at the University of California, Los Angeles with joint appointments in the departments of computer science, psychiatry, and psychology. He also served as co-director of the UCLA Center for Cognition, Vision, and Learning.

In 2016, Yuille joined Johns Hopkins University as the Bloomberg Distinguished Professor of Computational Cognitive Science. The Bloomberg Distinguished Professorship program was established in 2013 by a gift from Michael Bloomberg to endow professors whose areas of expertise bridge traditional academic disciplines and promote cross-disciplinary research and collaboration. Yuille holds appointments in the department of cognitive science in the Zanvyl Krieger School of Arts and Sciences and in the department of computer science in the Whiting School of Engineering.

== Research ==
Yuille develops mathematical models of vision and cognition that enable computers to reconstruct three-dimensional structures based on images or videos. His research interests include computational models of vision, mathematical models of cognition, medical image analysis, and artificial intelligence and neural networks. He directs the Computational Cognition, Vision, and Learning (CCVL) research group at Johns Hopkins University. Yuille and the CCVL develop models for designing artificial vision systems to provide assistance for people with vision impairments; computational models of biological vision; computational models of cognition to study how humans and animals perform tasks such as learning and reasoning; and models for machine learning to interpret medical images.

Yuille is working on The Felix Project (named after the fictional potion Felix Felicis, which, in the world of Harry Potter, brings drinkers unusually good luck). The project aims to use deep learning to improve early detection of pancreatic cancer by training computers to recognize it in CT scans and magnetic resonance images. Yuille and collaborators are attempting to develop algorithms to interpret CT and MR images of the pancreas and distinguish between a normal pancreas and a pancreas with a range of pathologies including tumors.

== Awards ==
- Marr Prize, ICCV 2003

== Selected publications ==
=== Books ===
- Data Fusion for Sensory Information Processing Systems, J.J Clark and A.L. Yuille, Kluwer Academic Publisheres, Boston, 1990.
- Active Vision, Eds. A. Blake and A.L. Yuille, MIT Press, Cambridge, MA, Oct. 1992.
- Two- and Three- Dimensional Patterns of the Face, P.W. Hallinan, G. Gordon, A.L. Yuille, P.J. Giblin and D.B. Mumford, Research Monograph, A K Peters, Ltd. 1999.

=== Articles ===
- 1992 with PW Hallinan, DS Cohen, Feature extraction from faces using deformable templates, in: International Journal of Computer Vision. Vol. 8, nº 2; 99-111.
- 1996 with SC Zhu, Region competition: Unifying snakes, region growing, and Bayes/MDL for multiband image segmentation, in: IEEE Transactions on Pattern Analysis and Machine Intelligence. Vol. 18, nº 9; 884-900.
- 2004 with D Kersten, P Mamassian, Object perception as Bayesian inference, in: Annual Review of Psychology. Vol. 55; 271-304.
- 2017 with LC Chen, G Papandreou, I Kokkinos, K Murphy, Deeplab: Semantic image segmentation with deep convolutional nets, atrous convolution, and fully connected crfs, in: IEEE Transactions on Pattern Analysis and Machine Intelligence. Vol. 40, nº 4; 834-848.
