= Rexford S. Ahima =

American diabetes researcher

Rexford Ahima
- Born: Rexford Sefah Ahima; Accra, Ghana
- Education: Accra Academy (1976; 1978) University of London (B.Sc.,1981); University of Ghana (M.D.,1986); Tulane University (Ph.D,1992)
- Scientific career
- Fields: Medicine
- Workplaces: Johns Hopkins University; University of Pennsylvania; Harvard University; Albert Einstein College of Medicine

Rexford Sefah Ahima is a professor of medicine, Public Health and Nursing; Bloomberg Distinguished Professor of Diabetes at the Johns Hopkins Medical School; and the Director of the Division of Endocrinology, Diabetes and Metabolism, Johns Hopkins University School of Medicine. Ahima's research focuses on central and peripheral actions of adipocyte hormones in energy homeostasis, and glucose and lipid metabolism.

== Biography ==
Rexford Ahima had his high school education at Accra Academy in Ghana. He gained a Bachelor of Science degree in Endocrinology from the Middlesex Hospital Medical School, University of London in 1981. He received his M.D. from the University of Ghana Medical School in 1986 and a Ph.D. from Tulane University in New Orleans, Louisiana in 1992. Ahima had his residency training in Internal Medicine at the Albert Einstein College of Medicine, Jack D. Weiler Hospital and Jacobi Medical Center in New York. Ahima did his clinical and research fellowship training in Endocrinology, Diabetes and Metabolism at the Beth Israel Deaconess Medical Center and Harvard Medical School in Boston.

At Harvard, he had his research fellowship in the laboratory of Dr. Jeffrey S. Flier, after which he served as an instructor in medicine at Harvard before moving to the University of Pennsylvania in 1999. He became a tenured professor of medicine at the Perelman School of Medicine at the University of Pennsylvania and was the Director of Obesity Unit, Institute for Diabetes, Obesity and Metabolism and Director of Diabetes Research Center Mouse Phenotyping Core.

In 2016, Ahima joined Johns Hopkins University as a Bloomberg Distinguished Professor of Diabetes with appointments in the School of Medicine, School of Nursing, and Bloomberg School of Public Health. He was also appointed Leader of the Johns Hopkins University Diabetes Initiative and Director of the Division of Endocrinology, Diabetes and Metabolism.

=== Research ===
Dr. Ahima's laboratory investigates CNS and peripheral actions of adipokines in energy homeostasis, and glucose and lipid metabolism. He has performed seminal studies to define the roles of leptin, adiponectin and resistin in obesity and diabetes using genetic techniques and metabolic phenotyping of mouse models. Moreover, he is involved in clinical and population studies focusing on the pathogenesis of obesity and Diabetes.

=== Awards and distinctions ===
Ahima was elected to the National Academy of Medicine in 2020, the American Academy of Arts and Sciences in 2023, the American Society for Clinical Investigation in 2005, the Association of American Physicians in 2010), the Interurban Clinical Club, and is a fellow of the American Association for the Advancement of Science, the American College of Physicians, and the Obesity Society. He is a past associate editor of the journals Gastroenterology, Molecular Endocrinology, Endocrinology, and Endocrine Reviews. He was the editor-in-chief of the Journal of Clinical Investigation. He is currently the editor of the Annals of the New York Academy of Sciences Year in Diabetes and Obesity, and associate editor of Journal of American Medical Association (JAMA)

== Publications ==
Ahima has more than 59,000 citations in and h-index of 99 in Google Scholar

- Pubmed Citations
- Google Scholar Citations

Books

- Can the Obesity Crisis Be Reversed? (2021)
- Metabolic syndrome: a comprehensive textbook (Springer)
- Metabolic basis of obesity (Springer)
- Obesity epidemiology, pathogenesis, and treatment: a multidisciplinary approach (Apple/CRC)
- Childhood obesity: prevalence, pathophysiology, and management (Apple/CRC)
- The Year in Diabetes and Obesity (Annals of the New York Academy of Sciences)_review series

Highly Cited Articles (more than 1300 citations)

- 2001 with CM Steppan, ST Bailey, S Bhat, EJ Brown, RR Banerjee, CM Wright, HR Patel, MA Lazar, The hormone resistin links obesity to diabetes, in: Nature. Vol. 409, nº 6818; 307–312.
- 1996 with D Prabakaran, C Mantzoros, D Qu, B Lowell, E Maratos-Flier, JS Flier, Role of leptin in the neuroendocrine response to fasting, in Nature. Vol. 382, nº 6588; 250–252.
- 2000 with JS Flier, Leptin, in Annual Review of Physiology. Vol. 62, nº 1; 413–437.
- 2000 with JS Flier, Adipose tissue as an endocrine organ, in Trends in Endocrinology & Metabolism. Vol. 11, nº 8; 327–332.
- 2009 with MA Hildebrandt, C Hoffman, SA Sherrill-Mix, SA Keilbaugh, M Hamady, YY Chen, R Knight, F Bushman, GD Wu, High-fat diet determines the composition of the murine gut microbiome independently of obesity, in Gastroenterology. Vol. 137, nº 5; 1716–1724.

== See also ==
- Journal of Clinical Investigation
- Bloomberg Distinguished Professorships
