= Ebony McGee =

Professor of Education

Ebony Omotola McGee
- Born: United States of America
- Known for: Advocating for the experience of minoritized students in STEM

Ebony Omotola McGee is an American professor of Innovation and Inclusion in the STEM Ecosystem at Johns Hopkins University's School of Education and Department of Mental Health. She holds a Bloomberg Distinguished Professorship. Prior to this position, she was a professor of STEM education at Vanderbilt University from 2012 until 2023.

== Early life and career ==
McGee completed a Bachelors at North Carolina A&T State University and Masters degree at New Jersey Institute of Technology in electrical engineering. Despite being well-trained and competent, she found herself in workplaces that drove her to experience stress that is now known as racial battle fatigue. This fueled McGee's focus on disparities in STEM education and pursue a Ph.D. in Mathematic education from the University of Illinois Chicago. Since then, McGee has published on structural racism within the traditional STEM ecosystem including peer-reviewed articles and op-eds in publications including Science, The Washington Post, and Nature Human Behaviour and Cancer. She has also summarized years of her work in a book titled Black, Brown, Bruised: How Racialized STEM Education Stifles Innovation published in 2020.

McGee has also served as a member of the research team for the Inclusion in Innovation Initiative (i4), a partnership between the NSF and the National GEM Consortium, providing infrastructure for the NSF Innovation Corps (I-Corps) Program for STEM entrepreneurship.

== Ideologies ==
McGee advocates for structural and institutional changes to address racial discrimination, stereotyping, and hostile environments in an effort to make the field more inclusive. A key concept in McGee's work is equity ethics.

McGee uses the tools of Afrofuturism to predict an alternate future where the inclusion of different ways of knowing and practicing science has led to better solutions and a thriving world.

She has focused on highlighting the consequences of disparities across the entire STEM pipeline from success in education, to entrepreneurship, to faculty hiring. She does this by via programs like R-RIGHTS (Racial Revolutionary and Inclusive Guidance for Health Throughout STEM) and ICQCM (Institute in Critical Quantitative, Computational, and Mixed Methodologies) which she co-founded.

== Awards ==
McGee is a 14-time National Science Foundation investigator awardee.

McGee's book Black, Brown, Bruised was a 2022 PROSE Award finalist.
