= Rachel Green (scientist) =

American biologist

- Born: October 24, 1964 (age 61)
- Education: University of Michigan (BS Chem); Harvard University (PhD)
- Spouse: Brendan Cormack
- Children: 3
- Scientific career
- Workplaces: Johns Hopkins University; University of California, Santa Cruz
- Thesis: An in vitro genetic analysis of the group I self-splicing intron (1992)

Rachel Green is an American biologist. She currently serves as a Bloomberg Distinguished Professor of molecular biology and genetics at the Johns Hopkins University School of Medicine. Her research focuses on ribosomes and their function in translation. Green has also been a Howard Hughes Medical Institute investigator since 2000.

== Early life and education ==
Rachel Green was born on October 24, 1964. Green grew up in Rocky River, Ohio, where her mother was a chemistry teacher. Green intended to study engineering in college, but changed her major to chemistry, earning a B.S. from the University of Michigan in 1986. She then earned a PhD in biochemistry from Harvard University in 1992, in the lab of Jack Szostak, where she studied RNA.

She did postdoctoral research at University of California Santa Cruz in the lab of Harry Noller, researching the function of the ribosome in E. coli.

== Career ==
Green joined the faculty at Johns Hopkins University School of Medicine in 1998. In 2007 she became a full professor at Johns Hopkins.

Green has been a Howard Hughes Medical Institute investigator since 2000.

She was elected to the National Academy of Sciences in 2012, to the National Academy of Medicine in 2017, and to the American Academy of Arts and Sciences in 2019.

== Research ==
The focus of Green's laboratory is defining the molecular mechanisms that affect that accuracy of translation in bacteria, yeast, and higher eukaryotic systems. After joining Johns Hopkins as a tenure-track assistant professor in 1998, Green began investigations into factors that control the translocation step of translation, where the ribosome moves forward over the messenger RNA (mRNA), prior to adding the next amino acid to the growing protein. Later, Green's research segued into studies on molecular factors and global mechanisms that affect translation accuracy. In particular, Green and her colleagues found that certain nucleotides in transfer RNA (tRNA) molecules affect the ability of the ribosome to determine and select the correct tRNA in each step of translation. Green's investigations into other aspects of translation quality control have included research into the mechanisms and effects of mRNA surveillance, in which mis-coded or nonfunctional mRNAs are subjected to degradation.

== Awards ==
- 1996 Burroughs Wellcome Career Award, Burroughs Wellcome Foundation
- 1999 Searle Scholarship Award, Searle Foundation
- 2000 Packard Fellowship Award, David and Lucile Packard Foundation
- 2012 Elected Member, National Academy of Sciences
- 2017 Elected Member, National Academy of Medicine
- 2019 Elected Member, American Academy of Arts and Sciences

== Publications ==
Green has more than 16,000 citations in Google Scholar and an h-index of 69.

- Pubmed Citations
- Google Scholar Citations

Selected Publications

- 2012 with S Djuranovic, A Nahvi, miRNA-mediated gene silencing by translational repression followed by mRNA deadenylation and decay, in: Science. Vol. 336, nº 6078; 237–240.
- 2010 with T Schneider-Poetsch, J Ju, DE Eyler, Y Dang, S Bhat, WC Merrick, B Shen, JO Liu, Inhibition of eukaryotic translation elongation by cycloheximide and lactimidomycin, in: Nature Chemical Biology. Vol. 6, nº 3; 209–217.
- 1997 with HF Noller, Ribosomes and translation, in: Annual Review of Biochemistry. Vol. 66, nº 1; 679–716.
- 2011 with S Djuranovic, A Nahvi, A parsimonious model for gene regulation by miRNAs, in: Science. Vol. 331, nº 6017; 550–553.
- 1989 with F Michel, M Hanna, DP Bartel, JW Szostak, The guanosine binding site of the Tetrahymena ribozyme, in: Nature. Vol. 342, nº 6248; 391–395.

== Personal life ==
Green's husband, Brendan Cormack, is also a geneticist at Johns Hopkins University. The couple has 3 children.
