= Jane M. Carlton =

Biologist

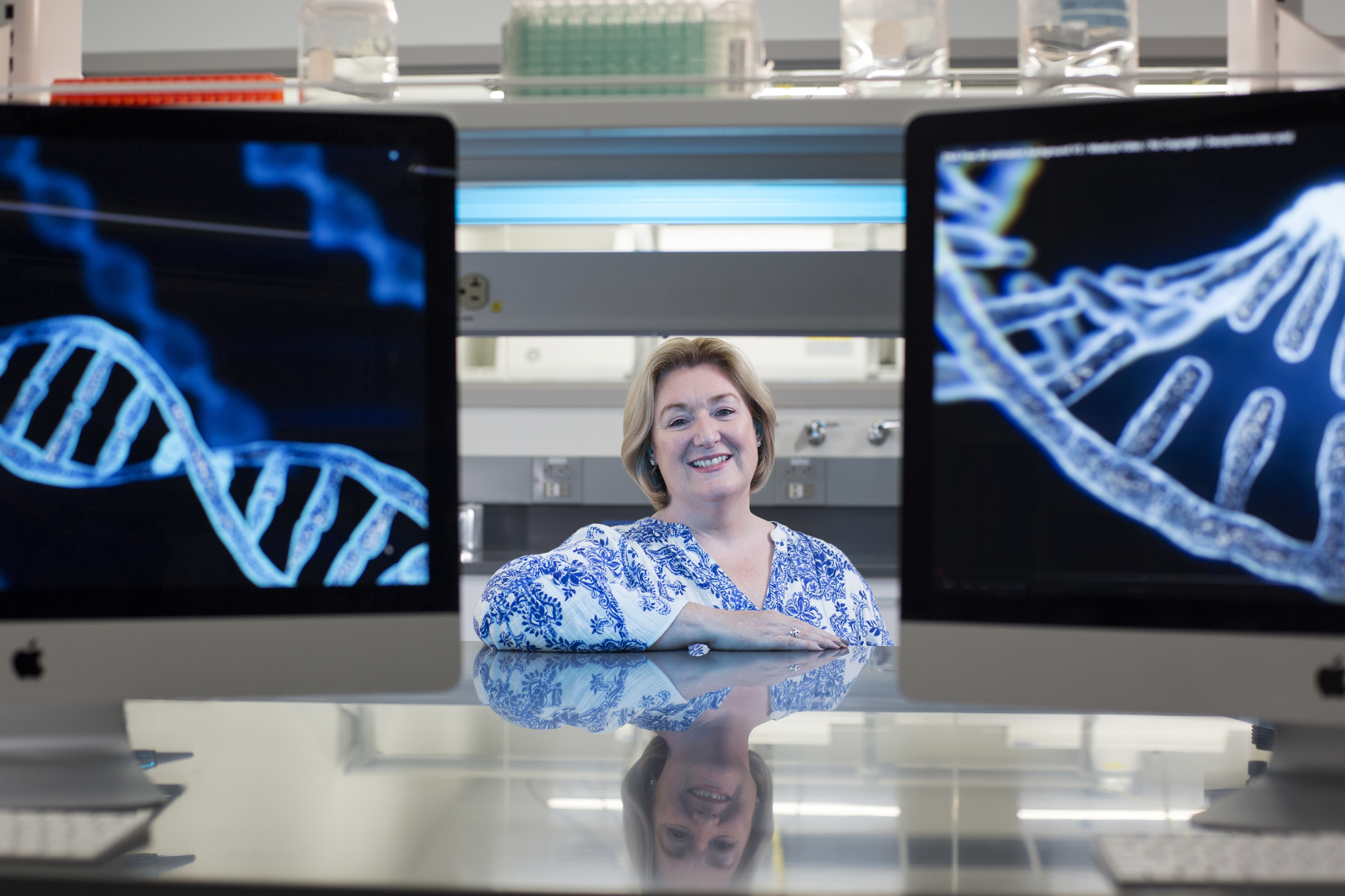

Jane M. Carlton is a British biologist at Johns Hopkins University. Her research centers on two groups of single-celled parasites: those which cause malaria (the genus Plasmodium), and trichomonads, which include the common sexually transmitted parasite Trichomonas vaginalis.

Carlton is a Bloomberg Distinguished Professor of Malaria Genomics and Public Health. She holds primary appointments in the Department of Molecular Microbiology and Immunology in the Bloomberg School of Public Health and in the Department of Biomedical Engineering, a department shared by the Whiting School of Engineering and the School of Medicine. She is also the director of the Johns Hopkins Malaria Research Institute.

== Education ==
Carlton received her Bachelor of Science in Biological Sciences (genetics) and her Ph.D. in genetics at the University of Edinburgh, Scotland. She completed a postdoctoral fellowship at the Institute of Cell, Animal and Population Biology at the University of Edinburgh, and was a postdoctoral associate in the Department of Pathobiology at the College of Veterinary Medicine, University of Florida.

== Career ==
Carlton began her career as an assistant scientist in the Department of Pathobiology at the University of Florida, Gainesville. She worked at the National Center for Biotechnology Information at the National Institutes of Health and the Institute for Genomic Research (now called the J. Craig Venter Institute) before joining the faculty at New York University as an associate professor in the Department of Molecular Parasitology in 2006. From 2009 until 2011, Carlton served as director of the Genome Technology Center at NYU. She later also held an appointment as a professor in the Department of Biology as well as faculty director of genomic sequencing in the Center for Genomics and Systems Biology, and in 2013, became director of the center. In 2018, she was named the Julius Silver, Roslyn S. Silver, and Enid Silver Winslow Professor of Biology. Silver Professors are named by NYU and chosen in recognition of their accomplishments and commitment to undergraduate education. In 2020, Carlton additionally joined the faculty in the School of Global Public Health at NYU as a professor of epidemiology.

In 2010, Carlton established and served as founding director for the Center for the Study of Complex Malaria in India (CSCMi), one of 10 National Institutes of Health (NIH)-funded International Centers of Excellence for Malaria Research (ICEMRs). The CSCMi partners with local researchers, clinicians, and public health workers to develop knowledge, tools, and evidence-based strategies to support Indian malaria intervention and control programs and to build malaria research capacity in India.

In 2023, Carlton left NYU to join Johns Hopkins University as director of the Johns Hopkins Malaria Research Institute in the Bloomberg School of Public Health. In 2024, she was named a Bloomberg Distinguished Professor.

== Research ==
Carlton is among a group of scientists recording and categorizing changes in all of the malaria parasite's genes at once, with a view toward detecting drug resistance in its earliest stages while it can still be controlled, finding new vulnerabilities in the parasite's genome that can be exploited to fight malaria. As Faculty Director of Genomic Sequencing at NYU's Center for Genomics and Systems Biology, Carlton is examining the genomes of dozens of malaria isolates at a time. Recently her group sequenced several genomes from both a human malaria species (Plasmodium vivax) and a closely related monkey malaria parasite (Plasmodium cynomolgi), producing a more detailed picture of malaria evolution and uncovering a surprising amount of genetic variation in the latter.

Carlton collaborates with scientists at National Institute of Malaria Research in India to develop new research paths and control strategies for the disease there. As Program Director of a seven-year NIH International Center of Excellence in Malaria Research based jointly in New Delhi and NYU, she heads the first pan-Indian genomic survey of malaria parasite strains, along with an in-depth epidemiological study of how the malaria is transmitted and manifests itself in different ecologies and societies in India.

Trichomonads are single-celled parasites that infect humans and other mammals as well as birds. One such parasite is Trichomonas vaginalis, which causes the most widespread non-viral human STD). Carlton led the group that sequenced the genome of Trichomonas vaginalis in 2007 – the first sequencing of any trichomonad genome – and uncovered families of genes that may be responsible for the membrane irritation and damage associated with trichomoniasis. The sequencing project also revealed that the parasite's genome is surprisingly large and composed mostly of highly repetitive ‘mobile’ DNA elements.

== Awards and honors ==
Carlton was the recipient of the Stoll-Stunkard Memorial Lectureship Award from the American Society of Parasitologists in 2010.

She was elected a Fellow of the American Association for the Advancement of Science in 2012.

In 2018, Carlton was named a Julius Silver, Roslyn S. Silver, and Enid Silver Winslow Professor in the Department of Biology at New York University.

In 2024, Carlton was named an Honorary Fellow by the London School of Hygiene & Tropical Medicine, the highest honor the School can bestow, in recognition "for her outstanding contributions to malaria research."

In 2025, Carlton was elected a Fellow of the American Academy of Microbiology.

== Publications ==
Selected highly cited publications:

- 2002 with MJ Gardner, N Hall, E Fung, O White, M Berriman, et al., Genome sequence of the human malaria parasite Plasmodium falciparum, in: Nature. Vol 419, nº 6906; 498–511.
- 2002 with AL Delcher, A Phillippy, SL Salzberg, Fast algorithms for large-scale genome alignment and comparison, in: Nucleic Acids Research. Vol. 30, nº 11; 2478–2483.
- 2005 with NM El-Sayed, PJ Myler, G Blandin, M Berriman, J Crabtree, et al., Comparative genomics of trypanosomatid parasitic protozoa, in: Science. Vol 309, nº 5733; 404–409.
- 2005 with N Hall, M Karras, JD Raine, TWA Kooij, M Berriman, et al., A comprehensive survey of the Plasmodium life cycle by genomic, transcriptomic, and proteomic analyses, in: Science. Vol 307, nº 5706; 82–86.
- 2007 with RP Hirt, JC Silva, AL Delcher, M Schatz, Q Zhao, et al., Draft genome sequence of the sexually transmitted pathogen Trichomonas vaginalis, in: Science. Vol 315, nº 5809; 207–212.
