= Richard L. Huganir =

American neuroscientist

- Born: March 25, 1953 (age 73)
- Education: Vassar College (B.S., 1975); Cornell University (Ph.D., 1982)
- Scientific career
- Fields: Neuroscience
- Workplaces: Johns Hopkins University
- Academic advisors: Efraim Racker

Richard Lewis Huganir (born March 25, 1953) is a Bloomberg Distinguished Professor in the Departments of Neuroscience and Psychological and Brain Sciences, Director of the Solomon H. Snyder Department of Neuroscience, and co-director of the Johns Hopkins Medicine Brain Science Institute at the Johns Hopkins University School of Medicine. He has joint appointments in the Department of Biological Chemistry and the Department of Pharmacology and Molecular Sciences in the Johns Hopkins School of Medicine.

== Biography ==
Huganir completed his undergraduate work in biochemistry at Vassar College in 1975. He received his Ph.D. degree in Biochemistry, Molecular and Cell Biology from Cornell University in 1982 where he performed his thesis research in the laboratory of Efraim Racker. He was a postdoctoral fellow with the Nobel Laureate, Paul Greengard, at Yale University School of Medicine from 1982-1984. Huganir then moved to the Rockefeller University where he was an Assistant Professor of Molecular and Cellular Neurobiology from 1984-1988. Huganir moved to the Johns Hopkins University School of Medicine in 1988 as an Associate Investigator in the Howard Hughes Medical Institute and an associate professor in the Department of Neuroscience. Huganir was an Investigator with the Howard Hughes Medical Institute from 1988-2014. Huganir became the Director or the Solomon H. Snyder Department of Neuroscience in 2006.

Huganir is currently the Chair of the Stanley Center for Psychiatric Research Scientific Advisory Committee and a recent member of the NIMH Council and the NIH BRAIN Multi-Council Working Group. Huganir is the past President of the Society for Neuroscience and has served as Treasurer of the Society for Neuroscience.

== Research ==
Huganir's career has focused on synapses, the connections between nerve cells, in the brain. Huganir's general approach has been to study molecular and cellular mechanisms that regulate neurotransmitter receptors. Huganir's studies have shown that the regulation of receptor function is a major mechanism for the regulation of neuronal excitability and connectivity in the brain and is critical for many higher brain processes including learning and memory and the proper development of the brain and is a major determinant of behavior. Moreover, dysregulation of these mechanisms underlie many neurological and psychiatric diseases in several neurological and psychiatric disorders including Alzheimer's, ALS, schizophrenia, autism, intellectual disability, PTSD as well as in chronic pain and drug addiction.

== Publications ==
Huganir has published over 300 papers in peer-reviewed journals. He has more than 71,000 citations in Google Scholar and an h-index of 145.

- Pubmed citations
- Google Scholar citations

Selected Publications

- 2004 with GM Thomas, MAPK cascade signaling and synaptic plasticity, in: Nature Reviews Neuroscience. Vol. 5, nº 3; 173-183.
- 2000 with HK Lee, M Barbarosie, K Kameyama, MF Bear, Regulation of distinct AMPA receptor phosphorylation sites during bidirectional synaptic plasticity, in: Nature. Vol. 405, nº 6789; 955-959.
- 1997 with PR Brakeman, AA Lanahan, R O'Brien, K Roche, CA Barnes, PF Worley, Homer: a protein that selectively binds metabotropic glutamate receptors, in: Nature. Vol. 386, nº 6622; 284-288.
- 1997 with H Dong, RJ O'Brien, ET Fung, AA Lanahan, PF Worley, GRIP: a synaptic PDZ domain-containing protein that interacts with AMPA receptors, in: Nature. Vol. 386, nº 6622; 279-284.
- 1996 with M Symons, JMJ Derry, B Karlak, S Jiang, V Lemahieu, F McCormick, U Francke, A Abo, Wiskott–Aldrich syndrome protein, a novel effector for the GTPase CDC42Hs, is implicated in actin polymerization, in: Cell. Vol. 84, nº 5; 723-734.
- 2007 with JD Shepherd, The cell biology of synaptic plasticity: AMPA receptor trafficking, in: Annual Review of Cell and Developmental Biology. Vol. 23; 613-643.

== Honors and awards ==
- Young Investigator Award, Society for Neuroscience (1991)
- Elected to the American Academy of Arts and Sciences (2001)
- Elected to the National Academy of Sciences (2004)
- Elected to the rank of AAAS Fellow (2004)
- Julius Axelrod Award, Society for Neuroscience (2007)
- Elected to the Institute of Medicine (2011)
- Goldman-Rakic Prize, Brain & Behavior Research Foundation (2014)
- Bloomberg Distinguished Professor, Johns Hopkins University (2018)
- Edward M. Scolnick Prize, McGovern Institute for Brain Research (2019)
- Ralph W. Gerard Prize, Society for Neuroscience (2022)
