= Vesla Weaver =

American political scientist

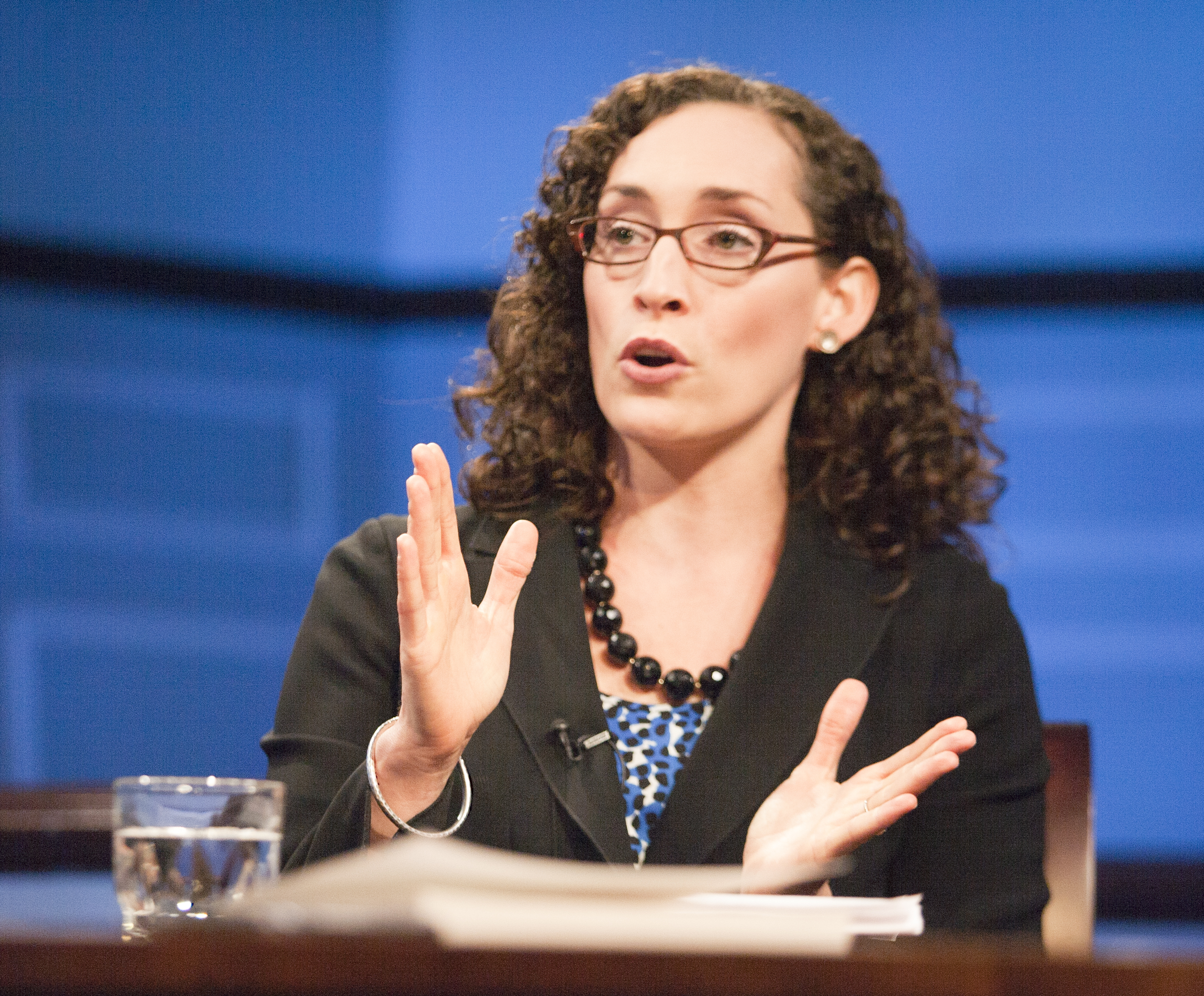
- Weaver in 2014
- Born: 1979 (age 46–47); Virginia, USA
- Spouse: Christopher Lebron
- Awards: Dennis Judd Best Book Award in Urban Politics (2015) for Arresting Citizenship; Andrew Carnegie Fellow (2016); Presidential Grant, Russell Sage Foundation (2015)

Academic background
- Education: B.A., Government, 2001, University of Virginia; PhD., Government and Social Policy, 2004, Harvard University
- Thesis: Frontlash: Race and the politics of punishment (2007)

Academic work
- Institutions: Johns Hopkins University; Yale University; University of Virginia
- Website: veslaweaver.com

Vesla Mae Weaver (born 1979) is an American political scientist and author. She is a Bloomberg Distinguished Professor of political science and sociology at Johns Hopkins University.

== Early life and education ==
Weaver was born in 1979. She earned her Bachelor of Arts degree from the University of Virginia before enrolling in Harvard University for her PhD.

== Career and research ==
Weaver is a Bloomberg Distinguished Professor of political science and sociology at Johns Hopkins Zanvyl Krieger School of Arts and Sciences. She researches racial inequality in the United States, discrimination based on skin color, economic polarization, and race in the United States criminal justice system. She serves on the Board of Directors of Annual Reviews.

== Selected works ==
=== Books ===
- Hochschild, Jennifer L.; Weaver, Vesla M.; Burch, Traci R. (2012). Creating a New Racial Order: How Immigration, Multiracialism, Genomics, and the Young Can Remake Race in America. Princeton University Press. ISBN 978-0-691-15299-8.
- Lerman, Amy E.; Weaver, Vesla M. (2014). Arresting Citizenship. University of Chicago Press. ISBN 978-0-226-13783-4.

=== Selected articles ===
- 2017 with J Soss, Police are our government: Politics, political science, and the policing of race–class subjugated communities, in: Annual Review of Political Science. Vol. 20; 565-591.
- 2014 with AE Lerman, Staying out of sight? Concentrated policing and local political action, in: The ANNALS of the American Academy of Political and Social Science. Vol. 652, nº 1; 202-219.
- 2010 with AE Lerman, Political consequences of the carceral state, in: American Political Science Review. 817-833.
- 2007 with JL Hochschild, The skin color paradox and the American racial order, in: Social Forces. Vol. 86, nº 2; 643-670.
- 2007, Frontlash: Race and the development of punitive crime policy, in: Studies in American Political Development. Vol. 21, nº 2; 230-265.
