= Daniel Polsky =

- Spouse: Tracey Jennifer Golembe (m. 2004)

Academic background
- Education: BS., Economics, University of Michigan; MPP., 1989, Gerald R. Ford School of Public Policy; PhD, economics, 1996, University of Pennsylvania
- Thesis: The changing nature of job security in the United States (1996)

Academic work
- Institutions: University of Pennsylvania; Johns Hopkins University
- Main interests: Health Economics

Daniel Elias Polsky is an American health economist. He is the 40th Bloomberg Distinguished Professor of Health Policy and Economics at Johns Hopkins University.

== Early life and education ==
Polsky grew up in Pittsburgh, Pennsylvania. He earned his Bachelor of Science at the University of Michigan before enrolling at their Gerald R. Ford School of Public Policy for his Master's degree. He returned home to Pennsylvania for his PhD in economics from the University of Pennsylvania.

== Career ==
Upon earning his PhD, Polsky accepted a faculty position at his alma mater in 1996. During his tenure at the university, he was appointed to sit on the President's Council of Economic Advisor from 2007 to 2008 and advised the Congressional Budget Office on health issues. Using his economic experience, Polsky served as the Leonard Davis Institute for Health Economics (LDI) Director of Research starting in 2008 and was eventually promoted to Executive Director in 2012. Two years later, his co-authored paper "Shipping out instead of shaping up: Rehospitalization from nursing homes as an unintended effect of public reporting," received the 2014 "Article of the Year" award from the AcademyHealth. The paper discussed how nursing home operators were gaming the Nursing Home Compare (NHC) system by inaccurately reporting their clinical indicators for patients. Their study urged "policymakers to consider doing more to adjust for baseline risk when reporting quality as a way to counter the incentives providers have to selectively avoid the sickest patients". As a result of his research, Polsky was appointed to the National Academy of Medicine's Health and Medicine Division Committee and eventually named a Member in 2018.

In 2019, Polsky left the University of Pennsylvania to become the 40th Bloomberg Distinguished Professor of Health Policy and Economics at Johns Hopkins University.

== Personal life ==
Polsky is Jewish and married his wife Tracey Jennifer Golembe in a Jewish ceremony in 2004.
