= Zanvyl Krieger =

American businessman and philanthropist

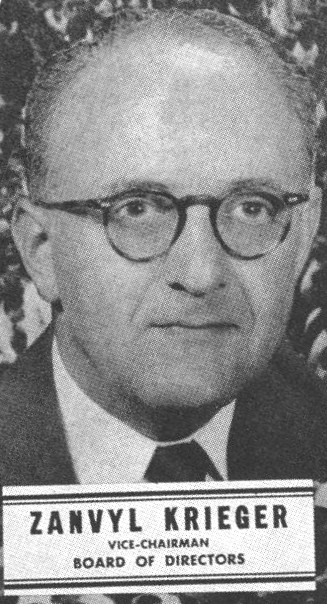
- Born: April 1, 1906; Baltimore, Maryland, US
- Died: September 15, 2000 (aged 94); Baltimore, Maryland, US
- Occupation: Businessman
- Spouse: Isabelle Lowenthal

Zanvyl Krieger (April 1, 1906 – September 15, 2000) was an American lawyer, businessman and philanthropist in Baltimore, Maryland. He was best known for his philanthropy, including major donations to the Johns Hopkins University and the Kennedy Krieger Institute. Krieger amassed his fortune through being heir to a liquor business and an investment in U.S. Surgical Corp, which manufactured surgical staples.

== Early life ==
The youngest of eight children, Zanvyl Krieger was born in Baltimore in 1906 to wealthy Jewish liquor sellers and distributors Herman and Bettie Farber Krieger. Owners of the Gunther Brewery and the largest distillery of rye whiskey in the country, his parents were very successful in business. Herman Krieger died when Zanvyl was just four. For high school, he attended Baltimore City College. After graduating high school, he attended the Johns Hopkins University, where he graduated in 1928 with a bachelor's degree in political science. He subsequently attended Harvard Law School, joining the law firm of Weinberg and Sweeten after his graduation in 1931.

== Business career ==
Krieger was a longtime lawyer at the firm Weinberg and Sweeten, staying with the firm from 1931 until his retirement in the 1990s. He was also an extremely successful businessman. He amassed his fortune through an investment in U.S. Surgical Corp. in 1964. The company brought a surgical incision stapling device developed in the Soviet Union to the United States.

== Philanthropy ==
Krieger was best known for his philanthropy. After amassing a large fortune, Krieger started donating his wealth to charities in the 1970s. He was a benefactor to the Kennedy Krieger Institute, Jewish Museum of Maryland, The Associated: Jewish Community Federation of Baltimore, Baltimore Symphony Orchestra, Krieger Schechter Day School, American Visionary Art Museum, Sinai Krieger Eye Institute at Sinai Hospital, Krieger Children's Eye Center at the Wilmer Institute at Johns Hopkins Hospital, and Johns Hopkins University School of Arts and Sciences. Krieger started the Zanvyl and Isabelle Krieger Fund to dispense his charitable money in 1978. Of his charitable works, Krieger said, "I did it because it gives me a great deal of satisfaction to be able to benefit others. I think the basis of life is satisfaction. We all do things to satisfy ourselves. If you have money, you might as well be able to enjoy it. I enjoy giving."

Perhaps his best known charitable contribution was a $50 million challenge grant to the Johns Hopkins University School of Arts and Sciences in 1992. It is one of the largest donations to a school of arts and sciences in the United States. The school was renamed in his honor after the donation.

== Baltimore sports ==
Krieger was a major investor in Baltimore sports, including the Baltimore Colts, Baltimore Orioles and Baltimore Clippers. He was a force in keeping the Colts franchise in Baltimore in 1952, but he later sold his stock to Carroll Rosenbloom. He regretted the decision when Robert Irsay moved the Colts to Indianapolis in 1984. Krieger later said, "When Irsay took the Colts, I was crushed. I felt I had lost my longtime friend. I felt I had given birth to something only to have this rascal come in and take it away. And the way he did it...it is something you never get over. Never."

In 1966, Krieger was named as lead of a Baltimore group awarded an alternate National Hockey League franchise that would come about if ownership for the conditional St. Louis franchise could not be found.

He sold his Orioles shares to Edward Bennett Williams in 1979.
