= Marijuana Enforcement Tracking Reporting Compliance =

American cannabis tracking system

Marijuana Enforcement Tracking Reporting Compliance (METRC) is a system for tracking state-legalized cannabis in Alabama, Alaska, California, Colorado, Washington D.C., Louisiana, Maine, Maryland, Massachusetts, Michigan, Minnesota, Mississippi, Missouri, Montana, Nevada, New Jersey, Ohio, Oklahoma, Oregon, South Dakota, U.S. Virgin Islands, Virginia,and West Virginia in the United States.

In 2017, a $59 million two-year contract was awarded by the State of California to Florida-based Franwell to create the system and supply RFID tags. The system was first developed for Colorado in 2011. As of mid-2017, Franwell's system was in use in California, Colorado, Oregon, Maryland, Alaska, and Michigan. In June 2017, Franwell withdrew from the Washington State Liquor and Cannabis Board state tracking contract due to the state's preference for vendor(s) who had multiple means of tracking other than proprietary RFID technology, and entry of data concerning non-compliance with regulations, such as production outside of stipulated limits.
