= Krieger School of Arts and Sciences =

Academic division of Johns Hopkins University

Coordinates: 38.908502°N 77.039649°W

- Gilman Hall, home to the School of Arts and Science's humanities departments, on Johns Hopkins' Homewood campus
- Type: Private
- Established: 1876
- Parent institution: Johns Hopkins University
- Dean: Christopher S. Celenza
- Undergraduates: 3,251 (fall 2023)
- Postgraduates: 1,007 (fall 2023)
- Location: Baltimore, Maryland, United States
- Campus: Urban
- Website: krieger.jhu.edu

The Krieger School of Arts and Sciences is the college of arts and sciences at the Johns Hopkins University, a private university in Baltimore, Maryland.

The school is based on the university's Homewood campus and, together with the Whiting School of Engineering, serves as one of Johns Hopkins University's main undergraduate teaching divisions. It offers undergraduate and graduate programs in the humanities, natural sciences, and social sciences.

== History ==
Johns Hopkins University, founded as the nation's first research university in 1876, originally hired "thirty of the profoundest scholars in the varied field of literature".

The original academic divisions of the university consisted of the Faculty of Philosophy, School of Hygiene and Public Health (now Bloomberg School of Public Health), School of Medicine, and School of Engineering. The School of Advanced International Studies became part of the university in 1950, and later the Peabody Conservatory was added in 1976.

The current School of Arts and Sciences was formed when the Faculty of Philosophy merged with the original School of Engineering in 1967–1968. A decade later, in 1979, engineering departments were once more separated with the founding of the G.W.C. Whiting School of Engineering.

It doesn't have the glamour of giving to a medical school. People don't realize that everything emanates from the arts and science college. It is the nucleus of the foundation of the university as a whole.

— Zanvyl Krieger

In December 1992, Zanvyl Krieger, a 1928 alumnus, gave a $50 million challenge grant to the School of Arts and Sciences, "the largest monetary gift in the university's history and one of the largest in American higher education". The school was renamed for Krieger, who explained that he chose to give the gift to the arts and sciences school because "People don't realize that everything emanates from the arts and science college. It is the nucleus of the foundation of the university as a whole".

In November 2013, the university released its draft "Strategic Planning Final Report for the Krieger School of Arts and Sciences". Under the plan, graduate student admissions would be reduced by 25% across all departments, but the stipends for those admitted would be increased. Additionally, as senior faculty retire, more junior teaching faculty would be hired to take their place.

Students objected in October 2016 when closure of the Humanities Center, which had been part of the school since 1966, was under consideration. In January 2017, the school's dean assured them that the center would not close, but would be reorganized around one of three proposals: "...keeping the center’s name while rethinking its role in relation to other humanities departments; renaming the department as something that more 'clearly conveys its identity and focus'; or transforming the humanities center into a comparative literature department..." In November 2017, after consultation with faculty in the department, the school announced that the Humanities Center would be renamed the Department of Comparative Thought and Literature.

In October 2017, the institution canceled its Russian major because it no longer aligned with the partner program in Russian at Goucher College in Towson, Maryland. Although students can still take Russian courses, a major in Russian is no longer offered.

In 2020, the university established a promotion and tenure committee to serve the entire institution. It was set up as a three-year pilot program and will be evaluated after that period.

In September 2025, the university announced that the Department of Neuroscience at the School of Medicine and the Department of Psychological and Brain Sciences at the School of Arts and Sciences would be merged into a new cross-university department for neuroscience.

== Academics ==
KSAS's educational offerings include over 60 undergraduate majors and minors, more than 40 full-time graduate programs, and over 20 part-time graduate programs.

Beginning with the class entering in the Fall of 2024, undergraduates at the School of Arts and Science are required to complete a comprehensive set of distribution requirements known as "Foundational Abilities" (FAs) in order to graduate. The six Foundational Abilities include Writing and Communication (15 credits required) Science and Data (15 credits), Culture and Aesthetics (15 credits), Citizens and Society (15 credits), Ethics and Foundations (15 credits), and Projects and Methods (6 credits).

All first-year undergraduates at the Krieger School are required to take part in a First-Year Seminar, which are designed to help students connect with their peers and faculty while settling into their freshman year of college, and the University Writing Program, which offers a Reintroduction to Writing course.

=== Humanities ===
Humanities at the School of Arts and Sciences consists of 9 academic departments as well as the Program in Archaeology and the Writing Seminars program.

- Department of Classics
- Department of Comparative Thought and Literature, formerly the Humanities Center from 1966 to 2017
- Department of English
- Department of History
- Department of the History of Art
- Department of the History of Science and Technology
- Department of Modern Languages & Literatures
- Department of Near Eastern Studies
- William H. Miller III Department of Philosophy

In February 2018, investor and alumnus Bill Miller donated $75 million to the philosophy department, to be used to increase the department's faculty and expand undergraduate and graduate programs. The philosophy department was subsequently renamed the William H. Miller III Department Philosophy in his honor.

=== Natural sciences ===
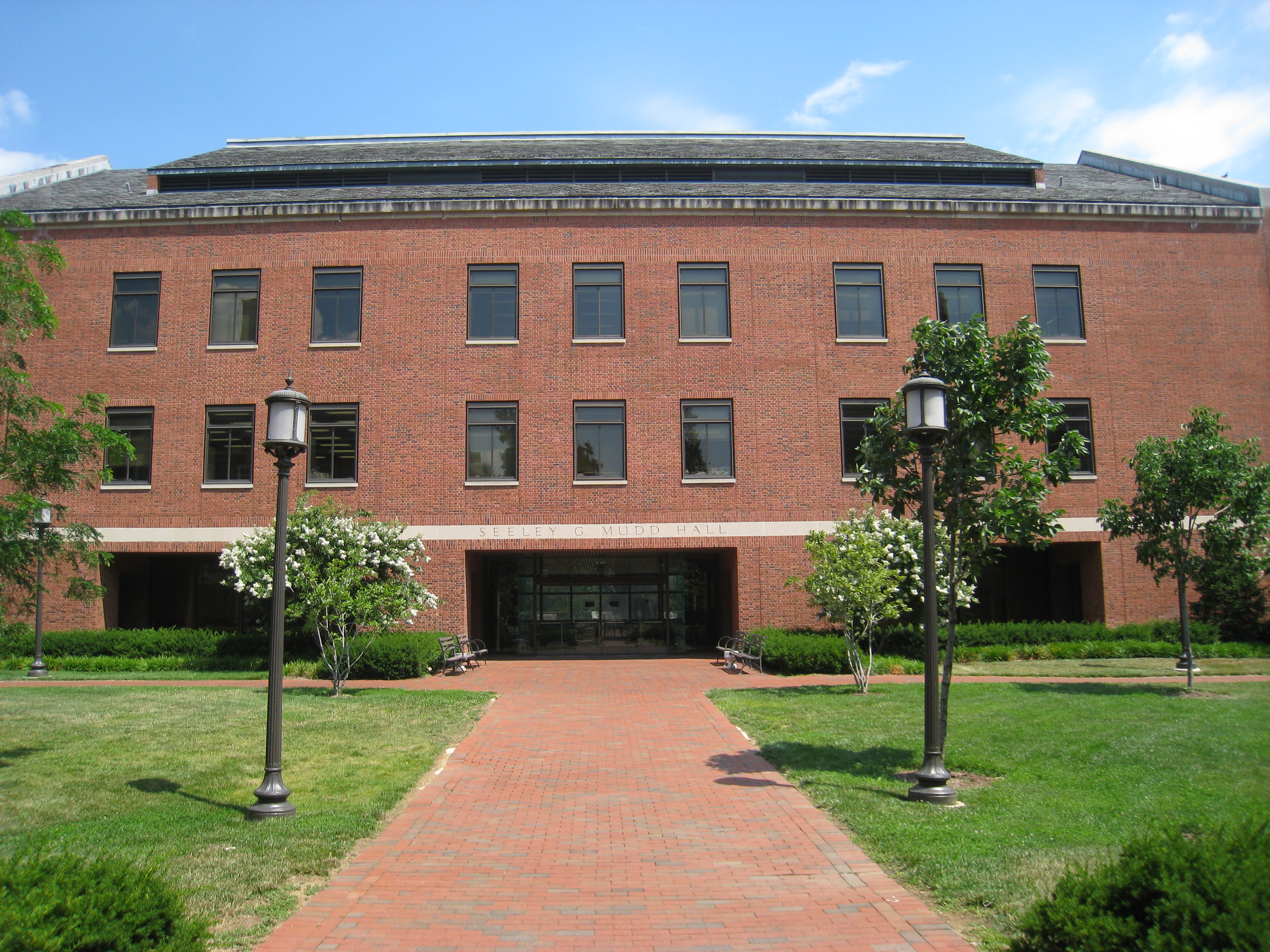
Mudd Hall, part of the JHU Biology Complex

Natural sciences at the School of Arts and Sciences consists of 8 academic departments as well as the Programs in Behavioral Biology, Molecular Biophysics, Neuroscience, and the Post-Baccalaureate Pre-Medical Program.

- Department of Biology
- Thomas C. Jenkins Department of Biophysics
- Department of Chemistry
- Department of Cognitive Science
- Morton K. Blaustein Department of Earth and Planetary Sciences
- Department of Mathematics
- William H. Miller III Department of Physics and Astronomy
- Solomon H. Snyder Department of Neuroscience

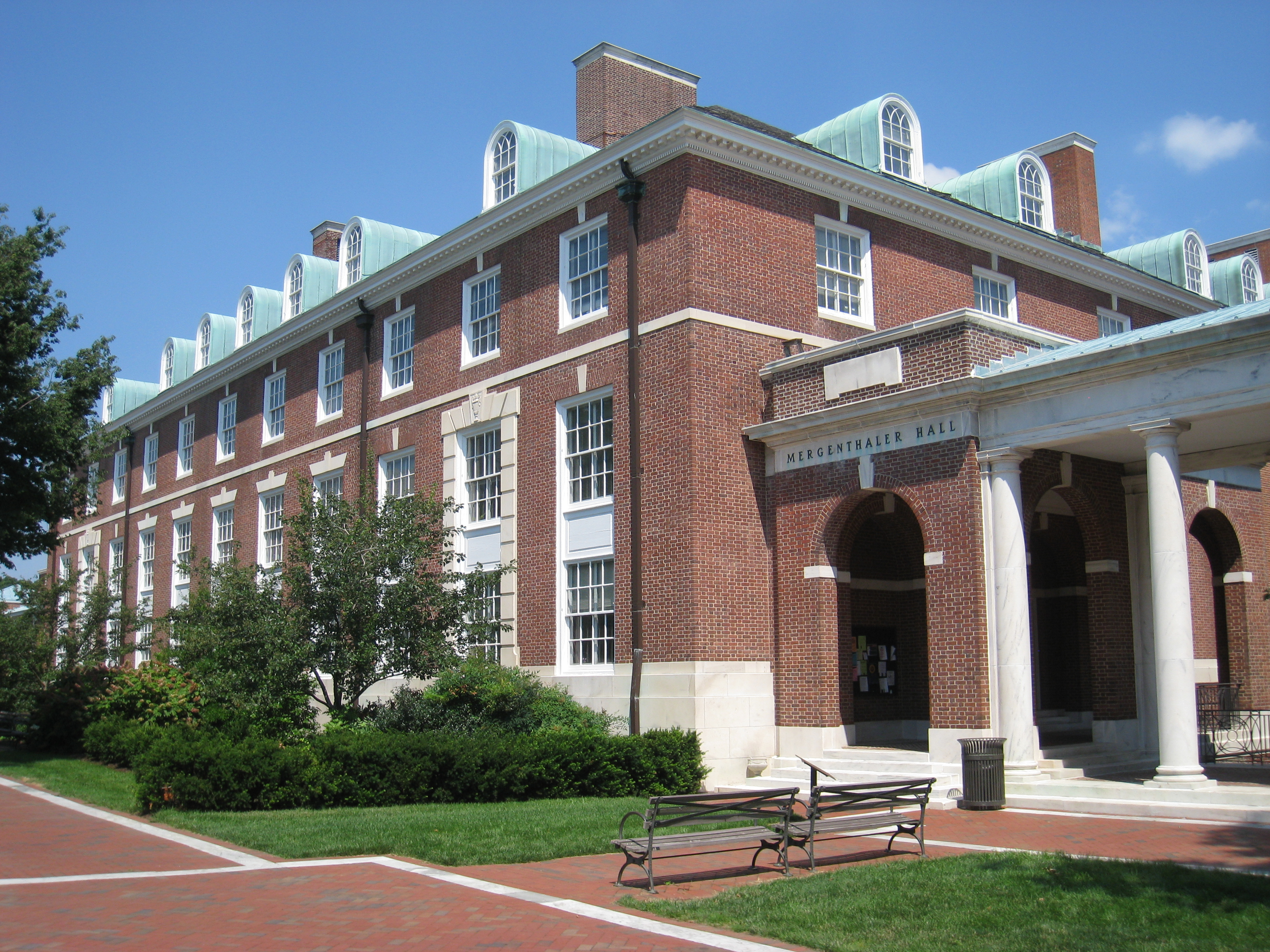
Mergenthaler Hall, home of the economics, sociology, art history, and political science departments

=== Social sciences ===
Social sciences at the School of Arts and Sciences consists of 4 academic departments as well the Program in Public Health.

- Department of Anthropology
- Department of Economics
- Department of Political Science
- Department of Sociology

=== Interdisciplinary Programs ===
- Chemistry-Biology Interface Program (graduate)
- Medicine, Science, and the Humanities Major
- Program for the Study of Women, Gender, and Sexuality
- Program in Cell, Molecular, Developmental Biology, and Biophysics (graduate)
- Program in East Asian Studies
- Program in Film & Media Studies
- Program in Environmental Science & Studies
- Program in International Studies
- Program in Islamic Studies
- Leonard and Helen R. Stulman Program in Jewish Studies
- Program in Latin American, Caribbean, and Latinx Studies
- Program in Museums and Society
- Program in Music
- Program in Theatre Arts & Studies
- University Writing Program

=== Advanced academic programs ===
The Johns Hopkins University offers part-time graduate programs through the Advanced Academic Programs (AAP), a division of the Krieger School of Arts and Sciences centered in Washington, DC.

== Notable faculty ==
=== Natural Sciences ===
- Charles L. Bennett - Bloomberg Distinguished Professor, Department of Physics and Astronomy; principal investigator of NASA's Wilkinson Microwave Anisotropy Probe
- Riccardo Giacconi - astrophysicist, 2002 Nobel Prize in Physics
- Adam Riess - Bloomberg Distinguished Professor, Departments of Physics and Astronomy & Earth and Planetary Sciences; shared the 2011 Nobel Prize in Physics for providing evidence for the accelerating expansion of the universe
- Christopher Sogge - J.J. Sylvester Professor, Department of Mathematics; editor-in-chief of the American Journal of Mathematics
- Alan Yuille - Bloomberg Distinguished Professor, Department of Cognitive Science

=== Social Sciences ===
- Robert C. Lieberman - political scientist, 14th provost of the university
- Monica Prasad - Bloomberg Distinguished Professor, Department of Sociology
- Vesla Weaver - Bloomberg Distinguished Professor, Departments of Political Science and Sociology

=== Humanities ===
- John Barth - Writer, influential in postmodern fiction
- Sean M. Carroll - Homewood Professor of Natural Philosophy, Department of Philosophy and Department of Physics and Astronomy
- N. D. B. Connolly - Herbert Baxter Adams Associate Professor of History
- René Girard - literary theorist and philosopher, developed mimetic theory
- Richard Macksey - co-founder and longtime director of the Humanities Center, now Department of Comparative Thought and Literature
- Alice McDermott - novelist and essayist
- J. Hillis Miller - literary critic associated with the Yale School, leading proponent of deconstruction
- Georges Poulet - literary critic and leader of the Geneva school
- Lawrence M. Principe - Drew Professor of the Humanities; Director, Singleton Center for the Study of Premodern Europe
