= Manjari Miller =

Manjari Chatterjee Miller
- Notable work: Routledge Handbook of China-India Relations (2020); Wronged by Empire: Post-Imperial Ideology and Foreign Policy in India and China (2013); Why Nations Rise: Narratives and the Path to Great Power (2021)

Manjari Chatterjee Miller is professor of international relations and the inaugural Munk Chair in Global India at the Munk School of Global Affairs and Public Policy, University of Toronto. She specializes in narratives in rising powers, particularly China and India. She is a Senior Fellow at the Council on Foreign Relations in Washington D.C. Previously she was an associate professor of international relations at Boston University

== Early life and education ==
Miller received a BA from the University of Delhi in India and an MA from the University of London in the United Kingdom.

Miller received her PhD from Harvard University and completed a post-doctoral fellowship at Princeton University.

== Notable work ==
In 2013, Miller published Wronged by Empire on the response to colonization in India and China.

In 2021, Miller published Why Nations Rise, which draws on the historical cases of the United States, Meiji Japan, the Netherlands, and Cold War Japan. Miller focuses on the role of narratives in rising powers in the context of contemporary China and India.
