= Christopher Cannon (medievalist) =

American medievalist

- Born: 1964 (age 61–62)

Academic background
- Education: Harvard University (B.A. 1987, M.A. 1989, Ph.D. 1993)
- Thesis: The making of Chaucer's English: a study in the formation of a literary language

Academic work
- Discipline: Medievalist
- Institutions: Johns Hopkins University

Christopher Cannon is a medievalist at Johns Hopkins University. He is currently Bloomberg Distinguished Professor of English and Classics, previously Chair of Classics, and from 2020-2024 Vice Dean for the Humanities and Social Sciences in the Krieger School of Arts and Sciences. His research and writings have focused on the works of Geoffrey Chaucer, early Middle English, and elementary learning in the Middle Ages.

== Education ==
He was educated at Harvard University (AB, AM, PhD). He received his doctorate in 1993 for a thesis "The making of Chaucer's English: a study in the formation of a literary language".

== Career ==
Prior to moving to Hopkins in 2017, Cannon was chair of the Department of English at New York University for 5 years. He held the Katharine Jex Blake Research Fellowship at Girton College, Cambridge (1993-6) and taught (for a time concurrently with his research fellowship) at UCLA (1995-6). He then taught at the University of Oxford in the Faculty of English and as Tutorial Fellow of St Edmund Hall (1997-2000) and, then, in the Faculty of English at the University of Cambridge, first as a Fellow of Pembroke College and then, again, as a Fellow of Girton College. He was general co-editor of Oxford Studies in Medieval Literature and Culture. He was elected to the Fellowship of the Medieval Academy of America in 2025.

== Works ==
=== Monographs ===
- From Literacy to Literature: England, 1300-1400 Oxford University Press, 2016 ISBN 9780191824562 Review:
- Middle English Literature: a cultural history Polity, 2008 ISBN 9780745673585.
- The Grounds of English Literature Oxford; New York : Oxford University Press, 2004 ISBN 9781429422024 Review:
- The Making of Chaucer's English: A Study of Words. Cambridge: Cambridge University Press, 1998.

=== Edited works ===
- Mann, Jill, Christopher Cannon, and Maura Nolan. Medieval Latin and Middle English Literature: Essays in Honour of Jill Mann. Cambridge: Cambridge University Press, 2013. ISBN 9781846159268

=== Editions ===
In 2024, Cannon co-edited with Harvard's James Simpson a new edition of Chaucer whose goal was to produce an edition of Chaucer's work that sounds "authentically Chaucerian".

== Prizes ==
- William Riley Parker Prize at MLA (2014)
- John Simon Guggenheim Foundation Fellowship (2002-3)
- The Van Courtlandt Elliott Prize, Medieval Academy of America (1995)
