= Ellen J. MacKenzie =

American scientist and academic administrator

- Education: Rutgers University (BA); Johns Hopkins University (MS, PhD)
- Occupations: Scientist, academic administrator
- Known for: Major Extremity Trauma Research Consortium

Ellen J. MacKenzie is an American researcher and former dean of the Johns Hopkins Bloomberg School of Public Health. She is an expert in trauma care and health policy and management, and an elected fellow of the National Academy of Medicine.

== Education ==
MacKenzie received her bachelor's degree in 1972 from Rutgers University. She earned a master's degree in 1975 and a PhD in 1979, both from the Johns Hopkins Bloomberg School of Public Health.

== Career ==
MacKenzie joined the Bloomberg School faculty in 1979. She was made a full professor in 1991. In 2005, she was named the Fred and Julie Soper Professor and Chair of the Department of Health Policy and Management. She was made a Bloomberg Distinguished Professor in 2017.

In 1994, she was appointed the director of the Johns Hopkins Center for Injury Research and Policy, and she held this position until 2005. From 1996 to 2000, she was the senior associate dean for academic affairs at the Bloomberg School. MacKenzie has been dean of the Johns Hopkins Bloomberg School of Public Health since October 2017. The school has 1,400 faculty members and more than 2,200 students. She is the first woman to hold this position.

She founded and leads the Major Extremity Trauma Research Consortium, which has more than 50 trauma centers as members. MacKenzie served as the president of the Association for the Advancement of Automotive Medicine in 1993 and the American Trauma Society in 2005.

The Centers for Disease Control and Prevention named her in 2012 as one of "20 leaders and visionaries who have made a transformative effect on the field of violence and injury prevention". She was elected as a fellow of the National Academy of Medicine in 2018. She is an author of more than 240 scientific publications and her research has been cited in scholarly works 18,500 times.

== Awards ==
- 2018 Elected member, National Academy of Medicine
- 2015 Lifetime Achievement Award in Trauma Resuscitation Science from the American Heart Association
- 2003 Ann Doner Vaughan Kappa Delta Award, American Academy of Orthopaedic Surgeons
- 1994 Named Honorary Fellow, American Association for the Surgery of Trauma
- Distinguished Career Award, American Public Health Association (Injury Control and Emergency Health Services Section)
- Distinguished Achievement Award, American Trauma Society
- Award of Merit, Association for the Advancement of Automotive Medicine
- Nursing Leadership Award, Society of Trauma Nurses
