= Jessica Fanzo =

American scientist

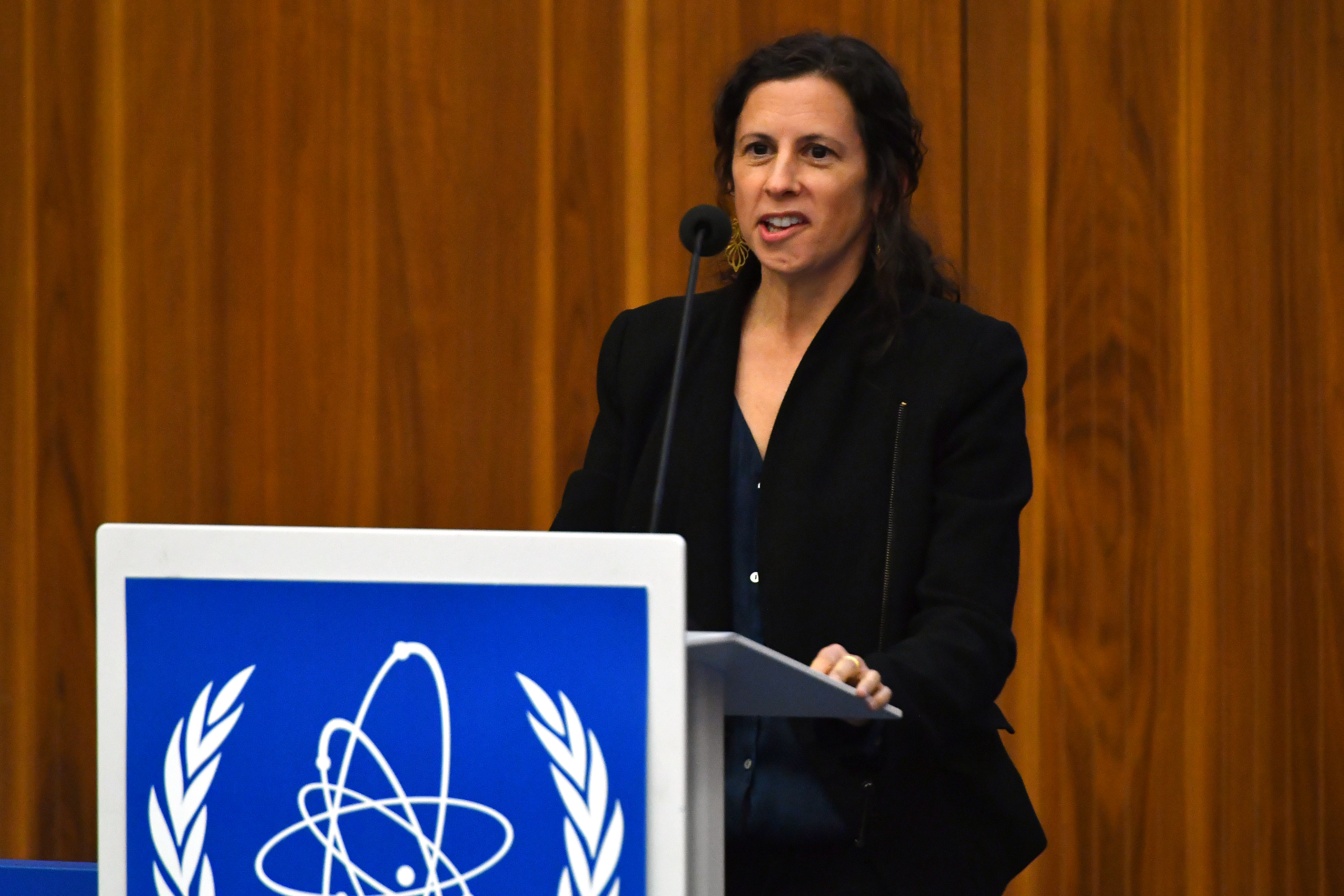

Academic background
- Education: BSc, 1994, MS, 1996, PhD, nutrition, 2000, University of Arizona
- Thesis: The influence of zinc status onp53 tumor suppressor gene expression and p53 target genes in human hepatoblastoma, bronchial epithelial, and aortic endothelial cells (2000)

Jessica Fanzo is an American scientist. She is the James Anderson Professor of Food Policy and Climate at the Johns Hopkins University's School of Advanced International Studies (SAIS) in Bologna Italy. Prior to joining Johns Hopkins, she was a Professor of Climate and Food and the Director of the Food for Humanity Initiative at the Columbia Climate School. From 2015 to 2023, she was the Bloomberg Distinguished Professor of Global Food and Agriculture Policy and Ethics at the Johns Hopkins Berman Institute of Bioethics, the Bloomberg School of Public Health, and the Paul H. Nitze School of Advanced International Studies. She was the first laureate of the Carasso Foundation’s Sustainable Diets Prize in 2012 for her research on sustainable food and diets for long-term human health. In 2024, Fanzo was elected a member of the National Academy of Sciences.

== Early life and education ==
Fanzo earned her Bachelor of Science degree in Agriculture, Master's degree in Nutritional Sciences and an interdisciplinary PhD in Nutrition from the University of Arizona, and completed a Stephen I. Morse postdoctoral fellowship in Immunology at the College of Physicians and Surgeons at Columbia University.

== Career ==
Upon completing her postdoctoral research, Fanzo chose to focus on the field of global health and went to rural sub-Saharan Africa to assist with international work on HIV/AIDS. In 2007, Fanzo was appointed the nutrition director of Columbia University's Earth Institute and provided technical and policy counsel on international development projects and programs as the senior adviser for nutrition policy at Columbia's Center on Globalization and Sustainable Development and at the Millennium Development Goal (MDG) Centre in the World Agroforestry Center in Kenya. From 2010, she took positions at Bioversity International and the United Nations World Food Programme. She then began an Assistant Professorship at Columbia University’s Department of Pediatrics at the Medical School and held a position at the Institute of Human Nutrition, but left Columbia in 2015 to become the Bloomberg Distinguished Professor of Global Food and Agriculture Policy and Ethics at the Johns Hopkins Berman Institute of Bioethics, the Bloomberg School of Public Health, and the Paul H. Nitze School of Advanced International Studies. She took a year's sabbatical from Johns Hopkins University to serve as the Senior Programme Officer for Nutrition and Food Systems at the Food and Agriculture Organization. She served as the Team Lead on Food Security and Nutrition.

Fanzo's research is on sustainable food systems and their impacts on healthy and equitable diets in resource-constrained contexts. She is the highest ranked scholar in food systems for the last five years according to Scholar GPS Rank.

She has participated in various collective endeavors, including the Food Systems Economic Commission, the Scaling Up Nutrition Movement, the Global Panel of Agriculture and Food Systems for Nutrition Foresight 2.0 report, the Lancet Commission on Anaemia, and the EAT-Lancet Commissions 1 and 2. She was also the Co-Chair of the Global Nutrition Report and Team Leader for the UN High-Level Panel of Experts on Food Systems and Nutrition.

Fanzo has worked as an advisor for various organizations and governments, including the Global Alliance for Improved Nutrition (GAIN), the International Food Policy Research Institute (IFPRI), PATH, the Scaling Up Nutrition movement (SUN), the UN Standing Committee on Nutrition (UNSCN), USAID, the World Bank, and the World Health Organization (WHO).

She is the author of two books, Can Fixing Dinner Fix the Planet? published in 2021 by Johns Hopkins Press and Global Food Systems, Diets and Nutrition published as part of the Palgrave Studies in Agricultural Economics and Food Policy. Fanzo has served as the Editor-in-Chief of Global Food Security and as an Associate Editor on The American Journal of Clinical Nutrition.

Currently Fanzo leads the development of the Food Systems Dashboard and the Food Systems Countdown to 2030 Initiative in collaboration with the Global Alliance of Improved Nutrition (GAIN). She also serves as the co-chair on the Executive Committee for the Scaling Up Nutrition movement and the Integrated Partnership Board for the CGIAR.

== Personal life ==
Fanzo and her husband write a blog titled Goat Rodeo. She writes a blog titled The Food Archive.

== Selected publications ==
- Can Fixing Dinner Fix the Planet? (2021)
- Global Food Systems, Diets, and Nutrition: Linking Science, Economics, and Policy (2021)
