= Eliana Perrin =

American physician

- Education: Swarthmore College (B.A., 1993); University of Rochester (M.D., 1997); Stanford University (internship, pediatrics residency); University of North Carolina at Chapel Hill (MPH, 2002)
- Scientific career
- Workplaces: Johns Hopkins University; Duke University; University of North Carolina at Chapel Hill

Eliana Perrin is an American pediatrician, researcher, and Bloomberg Distinguished Professor of Primary Care with joint appointments with tenure in the Department of Pediatrics in the School of Medicine and in the School of Nursing at Johns Hopkins University. She was elected a member of the American Pediatric Society in 2021.

== Early life and education ==
Perrin was an undergraduate at Swarthmore College where she specialized in biology and education. She moved to the University of Rochester to study medicine, and graduated with Alpha Omega Alpha honors and with the Janet M. Glasgow Memorial Achievement Award, given to the woman who graduates first in her medical school class. She was a medical resident in pediatrics at Stanford University. During her residency she became interested in medical research and numerous unsolved challenges in children's health. After completing her residency, she moved to the University of North Carolina at Chapel Hill, where completed the Robert Wood Johnson Clinical Scholars program and earned a Master of Public Health in Health Care and Prevention.

== Research and career ==
Perrin was appointed to the faculty of the University of North Carolina (UNC), Chapel Hill, as an assistant professor of pediatrics in 2002, where she served as both clinician and a researcher. She practiced as a board-certified pediatrician in Chapel Hill, North Carolina. She became an associate professor with Tenure in 2010 and a Professor with Tenure in 2017. She was appointed an Associate Vice Chancellor for Research at UNC in 2014, overseeing the Office of Research Development and Office of Postdoctoral Affairs. She also completed the Academic Leadership program in 2012 and won the Phillip and Ruth Hettleman Award for Scholarly and Artistic Achievement (a university-wide award) in 2013 and gave the honorary lecture in 2014. In her time at UNC, she also has served as research director in the Division of General Pediatrics and Adolescent Medicine and as the Director of the Child Health Program for the Cecil G. Sheps Center for Health Services Research.

In 2017, Perrin moved to Duke University, where she was appointed Division Chief of the Division of Primary Care in the Department of Pediatrics, and founded and directed the Duke Center for Childhood Obesity Research. She was elected to chair the national Executive Research Committee for the Academic Pediatric Association (APA) for a three-year term from 2018 to 2021. In 2021, Perrin joined Johns Hopkins University as a Bloomberg Distinguished Professor with joint appointments with tenure in the School of Medicine and the School of Nursing. That year she was also elected as a member of the American Pediatric Society.

Perrin's research considers patient-oriented primary care, childhood obesity and health disparities. In the United States, one in three children is overweight or obese. Perrin has developed tools and programs that can prevent and treat obesity. She makes use of both qualitative and quantitative methods to identify causes, correlates, and prevention of obesity, with a particular focus on disadvantaged communities. These include low-income communities who do not have the resources to eat healthily or keep physically active.

In an article named one of 2004's 10 best articles by Contemporary Pediatrics, Perrin wrote that using Body Mass Index (BMI) charts was more helpful for parents to recognize weight problems in children than height and weight charting.

Perrin investigates how pediatricians can make best use of their time during well-child visits to promote health and healthy behaviors. She investigates the role of BMI screening and communication and the relationship between BMI and health. She and colleagues have found severe obesity in children and young adults to be associated with an increased prevalence of cardiometabolic risk factors, and that increased weight in children is associated with elevated inflammatory markers. Perrin developed a toolkit using color-coded BMI charts and found that using these increased parental understanding of BMI charts, especially parents with lower numeracy, as well as impacted short-term dietary and physical activity behavior changes.

Perrin co-created Greenlight, a primary care program that seeks to prevent obesity in young children. Greenlight starts at infancy, and provides dietary, physical activity and screen time advice for parents and caretakers. She tracked almost 900 parent-child groups from their two-month to their five-year check-ups. The next generation of Greenlight includes asynchronous care elements like text messaging goals.

== Awards and distinctions ==
- 2011 American Academy of Pediatrics Special Achievement Award for Distinguished Service and Dedication to the Mission and Goals of the academy (for work on childhood obesity)
- 2013 Elected member of the Society for Pediatric Research
- 2013 Phillip and Ruth Hettleman Award for Scholarly and Artistic Achievement
- 2018 Denny, Katz, Simon, Tinglestad Academic Service Award, North Carolina Pediatric Society
- 2021 Member of the American Pediatric Society
- 2005–present Listed in "Guide to America's Top Pediatricians"
- 2009–present Listed in Best Doctors of America

== Selected publications ==
- Pubmed Citations
- Google Scholar Citations
- Skinner AC, Steiner MJ, Henderson FW, Perrin EM. Multiple markers of inflammation and weight status: cross-sectional analyses throughout childhood. Pediatrics. 2010; 125(4):e1-19.
- Oettinger MD, Finkle JP, Esserman D, Whitehead L, Spain TK, Pattishall SR, Rothman RL, Perrin EM. Color-coding improves parental understanding of body mass index charting. Academic Pediatrics. 2009; 9(5):330-338.
- Perrin EM, Skinner AC, Steiner MJ. Parental recall of physician communication of weight status: National Trends from 1999 through 2008. Archives of Pediatrics and Adolescent Medicine (now Jama Pediatrics). 2012; 166(4):317-322.
