= Medical Care (journal) =

- Discipline: Health care
- Language: English
- Edited by: Catarina Kiefe, Jeroan J. Allison

Publication details
- History: 1963-present
- Publisher: Lippincott Williams & Wilkins on behalf of the American Public Health Association
- Frequency: Monthly
- Impact factor: 3.081 (2016)

Standard abbreviations
- ISO 4: Med. Care

Indexing
- CODEN: MDLCBD
- ISSN: 0025-7079 (print); 1537-1948 (web)
- LCCN: sf81007016
- OCLC no.: 42662144

Links
- Journal homepage; Online access; Online archive

Medical Care is a peer-reviewed public health journal that covers the field of health care. The editors-in-chief are Catarina Kiefe and Jeroan J. Allison (University of Massachusetts Medical School). It was established in 1963 and is published by Lippincott Williams & Wilkins. It is the official journal of the Medical Care Section of the American Public Health Association.

== Abstracting and indexing ==
The journal is abstracted and indexed in:

- Scopus
- Index Medicus/MEDLINE/PubMed
- PsycINFO
- Science Citation Index
- Social Sciences Citation Index
- Current Contents/Social & Behavioral Sciences
- Current Contents/Clinical Medicine

According to the Journal Citation Reports, the journal has a 2016 impact factor of 3.081, ranking it 15th out of 89 journals in the category "Health Care Sciences and Services".
