= Evolution of cells =

Evolutionary origin and subsequent development of cells

Evolution of cells refers to the evolutionary origin and subsequent evolutionary development of cells. Cells first emerged at least 3.8 billion years ago approximately 750 million years after Earth was formed.

== The first cells ==
Life timeline
← / Earth formed; ← / Earliest water; ← / LUCA; ← / Earliest fossils; ← / Great Oxygenation Event; ← / Sexual reproduction; ← / Earliest fungi; ← / Neoproterozoic oxygenation event; ← / Ediacaran biota; ← / Cambrian explosion; ← / Earliest tetrapods; ← / Earliest hominoid
(million years ago)

The initial development of the cell marked the passage from prebiotic chemistry to partitioned units resembling modern cells. The final transition to living entities that fulfill all the definitions of modern cells depended on the ability to evolve effectively by natural selection. This transition has been called the Darwinian transition.

If life is viewed from the point of view of replicator molecules, cells satisfy two fundamental conditions: protection from the outside environment and confinement of biochemical activity. The former condition is needed to keep complex molecules stable in a varying and sometimes reactive environment; the latter is fundamental for the evolution of biocomplexity. If freely floating molecules that code for enzymes are not enclosed in cells, the enzymes will automatically benefit neighboring replicator molecules as well. Thus, the consequences of diffusion in non-partitioned lifeforms would result in "parasitism by default." Therefore, the selection pressure on replicator molecules will be lower, as the 'lucky' molecule that produces the better enzyme does not fully leverage its advantage over its close neighbors. In contrast, if the molecule is enclosed in a cell membrane, the enzymes coded will be available only to itself. That molecule will uniquely benefit from the enzymes it codes for, increasing individuality and thus accelerating natural selection.

Partitioning may have begun from cell-like spheroids formed by proteinoids, which are observed by heating amino acids with phosphoric acid as a catalyst. They bear much of the basic features provided by cell membranes. Proteinoid-based protocells enclosing RNA molecules could have been the first cellular life forms on Earth.

Another possibility is that the shores of the ancient coastal waters may have been a suitable environment for the initial development of cells. Waves breaking on the shore create a delicate foam composed of bubbles. Shallow coastal waters also tend to be warmer, further concentrating the molecules through evaporation. While bubbles made mostly of water tend to burst quickly, oily bubbles are much more stable. The phospholipid, the primary material of cell membranes, is an example of a common oily compound prevalent in the prebiotic seas.

Both of these options require the presence of massive amounts of chemicals and organic material in order to form cells. A large gathering of organic molecules most likely came from what scientists now call the prebiotic soup. The prebiotic soup refers to the collection of every organic compound that appeared on Earth after it was formed. This soup would have most likely contained the compounds necessary to form early cells.

Phospholipids are composed of a hydrophilic head on one end and a hydrophobic tail on the other. They can come together to form a bilayer membrane. A lipid monolayer bubble can only contain oil and is not conducive to harboring water-soluble organic molecules. On the other hand, a lipid bilayer bubble can contain water and was a likely precursor to the modern cell membrane. If a protein was introduced that increased the integrity of its parent bubble, then that bubble had an advantage. Primitive reproduction may have occurred when the bubbles burst, releasing the results of the experiment into the surrounding medium. Once enough of the right compounds were released into the medium, the development of the first prokaryotes, eukaryotes, and multi-cellular organisms could be achieved.

However, the first cell membrane could not have been composed of phospholipids due to its low permeability, as ions would not be able to pass through the membrane. Rather it is suggested that they were composed of fatty acids, as they can freely exchange ions, allowing geochemically sustained proton gradients at alkaline hydrothermal vents that might lead to prebiotic chemical reactions via CO_{2} fixation.

== Community metabolism ==
The common ancestor of the now existing cellular lineages (eukaryotes, bacteria, and archaea) may have been a community of organisms that readily exchanged components and genes. It would have contained:

- Autotrophs that produced organic compounds from CO_{2}, either photosynthetically or by inorganic chemical reactions;
- Heterotrophs that obtained organics from leakage of other organisms
- Saprotrophs that absorbed nutrients from decaying organisms
- Phagotrophs that were sufficiently complex to envelop and digest particulate nutrients, including other organisms.

The eukaryotic cell seems to have evolved from a symbiotic community of prokaryotic cells. DNA-bearing organelles like mitochondria and chloroplasts are remnants of ancient symbiotic oxygen-breathing bacteria and cyanobacteria, respectively, where at least part of the rest of the cell may have been derived from an ancestral archaean prokaryote cell. The archean prokaryote cell concept is often termed as the endosymbiotic theory. There is still debate about whether organelles like the hydrogenosome predated the origin of mitochondria, or vice versa: see the hydrogen hypothesis for the origin of eukaryotic cells.

How the current lineages of microbes evolved from this postulated community is currently unsolved, but subject of extensive research by biologists, stimulated by new discoveries in genome science.

== Genetic code and the RNA world ==
Modern evidence suggests that early cellular evolution occurred in a biological realm radically distinct from modern biology. It is thought that in this ancient realm, the current genetic role of DNA was largely filled by RNA, and catalysis was also largely mediated by RNA (that is, by ribozyme counterparts of enzymes). This concept is known as the RNA world hypothesis.

According to this hypothesis, the ancient RNA world transitioned into the modern cellular world via the evolution of protein synthesis, followed by replacement of many cellular ribozyme catalysts by protein-based enzymes. Proteins are much more flexible in catalysis than RNA due to the existence of diverse amino acid side chains with distinct chemical characteristics. The RNA record in existing cells appears to preserve some 'molecular fossils' from this RNA world. These RNA fossils include the ribosome itself (in which RNA catalyzes peptide-bond formation), the modern ribozyme catalyst RNase P, and RNAs.

The nearly universal genetic code preserves some evidence for the RNA world. For instance, recent studies of transfer RNAs, the enzymes that charge them with amino acids (the first step in protein synthesis) and the way these components recognize and exploit the genetic code, have been used to suggest that the universal genetic code emerged before the evolution of the modern amino acid activation method for protein synthesis. The first RNA polymers probably emerged prior to 4.17 Gya if life originated at freshwater environments similar to Darwin's warm little pond.

== Sexual reproduction ==
The evolution of sexual reproduction may be a primordial and fundamental characteristic of eukaryotes, including single cell eukaryotes. Based on a phylogenetic analysis, Dacks and Roger proposed that facultative sex was present in the common ancestor of all eukaryotes. Hofstatter and Lehr reviewed evidence supporting the hypothesis that all eukaryotes can be regarded as sexual, unless proven otherwise.

Sexual reproduction may have arisen in early protocells with RNA genomes (RNA world). Initially, each protocell would likely have contained one RNA genome (rather than multiple) since this maximizes the growth rate. However, the occurrence of damages to the RNA which block RNA replication or interfere with ribozyme function would make it advantageous to fuse periodically with another protocell to restore reproductive ability. This early, simple form of genetic recovery is similar to that occurring in extant segmented single-stranded RNA viruses (see influenza A virus).

As duplex DNA became the predominant form of the genetic material, the mechanism of genetic recovery evolved into the more complex process of meiotic recombination, found today in most species. It thus appears likely that sexual reproduction arose early in the evolution of cells and has had a continuous evolutionary history.

== Horizontal gene transfer ==
Horizontal gene transfer (HGT) is the movement of genetic information between different organisms of the same species mainly being bacteria. This is not the movement of genetic information between a parent and their offspring but by other factors. In contrast to how animals reproduce and evolve from sexual reproduction, bacteria evolve by sharing DNA with other bacteria or their environment.

There are three common mechanisms of transferring genetic material by HGT:

- Transformation: The bacteria assimilates DNA from the environment into their own
- Conjugation: Bacteria directly transfer genes from one cell to another
- Transduction: Bacteriophages (virus) move genes from one bacterial cell to another

Once one of these mechanisms has occurred the bacteria will continue to multiply and grow resistance and evolve by natural selection. HGT is the main cause of the assimilation of certain genetic material and the passing down of antibiotic resistance genes (ARGs).

== Canonical patterns ==
Although the evolutionary origins of the major lineages of modern cells are disputed, the primary distinctions between the three major lineages of cellular life (called domains) are firmly established.

In each of these three domains, DNA replication, transcription, and translation all display distinctive features. There are three versions of ribosomal RNAs, and generally three versions of each ribosomal protein, one for each domain of life. These three versions of the protein synthesis apparatus are called the canonical patterns, and the existence of these canonical patterns provides the basis for a definition of the three domains - Bacteria, Archaea, and Eukarya (or Eukaryota) - of currently existing cells.

== Using genomics to infer early lines of evolution ==
Instead of relying on a single gene such as the small-subunit ribosomal RNA (SSU rRNA) gene to reconstruct early evolution, or a few genes, scientific effort has shifted to analyzing complete genome sequences.

Evolutionary trees based only on SSU rRNA alone do not capture the events of early eukaryote evolution accurately, and the progenitors of the first nucleated cells are still uncertain. For instance, analysis of the complete genome of the eukaryote yeast shows that many of its genes are more closely related to bacterial genes than they are to archaea, and it is now clear that archaea were not the simple progenitors of the eukaryotes, in contradiction to earlier findings based on SSU rRNA and limited samples of other genes.

One hypothesis is that the first nucleated cell arose from two distinctly different ancient prokaryotic (non-nucleated) species that had formed a symbiotic relationship with one another to carry out different aspects of metabolism. One partner of this symbiosis is proposed to be a bacterial cell, and the other an archaeal cell. It is postulated that this symbiotic partnership progressed via the cellular fusion of the partners to generate a chimeric or hybrid cell with a membrane bound internal structure that was the forerunner of the nucleus. The next stage in this scheme was transfer of both partner genomes into the nucleus and their fusion with one another. Several variations of this hypothesis for the origin of nucleated cells have been suggested. Other biologists dispute this conception and emphasize the community metabolism theme, the idea that early living communities would comprise many different entities to extant cells, and would have shared their genetic material more extensively than current microbes.

== Quotes ==
"The First Cell arose in the previously prebiotic world with the coming together of several entities that gave a single vesicle the unique chance to carry out three essential and quite different life processes. These were: (a) to copy informational macromolecules, (b) to carry out specific catalytic functions, and (c) to couple energy from the environment into usable chemical forms. These would foster subsequent cellular evolution and metabolism. Each of these three essential processes probably originated and was lost many times prior to The First Cell, but only when these three occurred together was life jump-started and Darwinian evolution of organisms began." (Koch and Silver, 2005)

"The evolution of modern cells is arguably the most challenging and important problem the field of Biology has ever faced. In Darwin's day the problem could hardly be imagined. For much of the 20th century it was intractable. In any case, the problem lay buried in the catch-all rubric "origin of life"--where, because it is a biological not a (bio)chemical problem, it was effectively ignored. Scientific interest in cellular evolution started to pick up once the universal phylogenetic tree, the framework within which the problem had to be addressed, was determined. But it was not until microbial genomics arrived on the scene that biologists could actually do much about the problem of cellular evolution." (Carl Woese, 2002)
