= Department of Biomedical Engineering (Johns Hopkins University) =

- Former name: Division of Biomedical Engineering
- Established: 1961
- Parent institution: Johns Hopkins University
- Head of Department: Michael I. Miller
- Academic staff: 52
- Students: 741
- Undergraduates: 475
- Doctoral students: 184
- Other students: 82
- Location: Baltimore, Maryland, USA
- Website: www.bme.jhu.edu
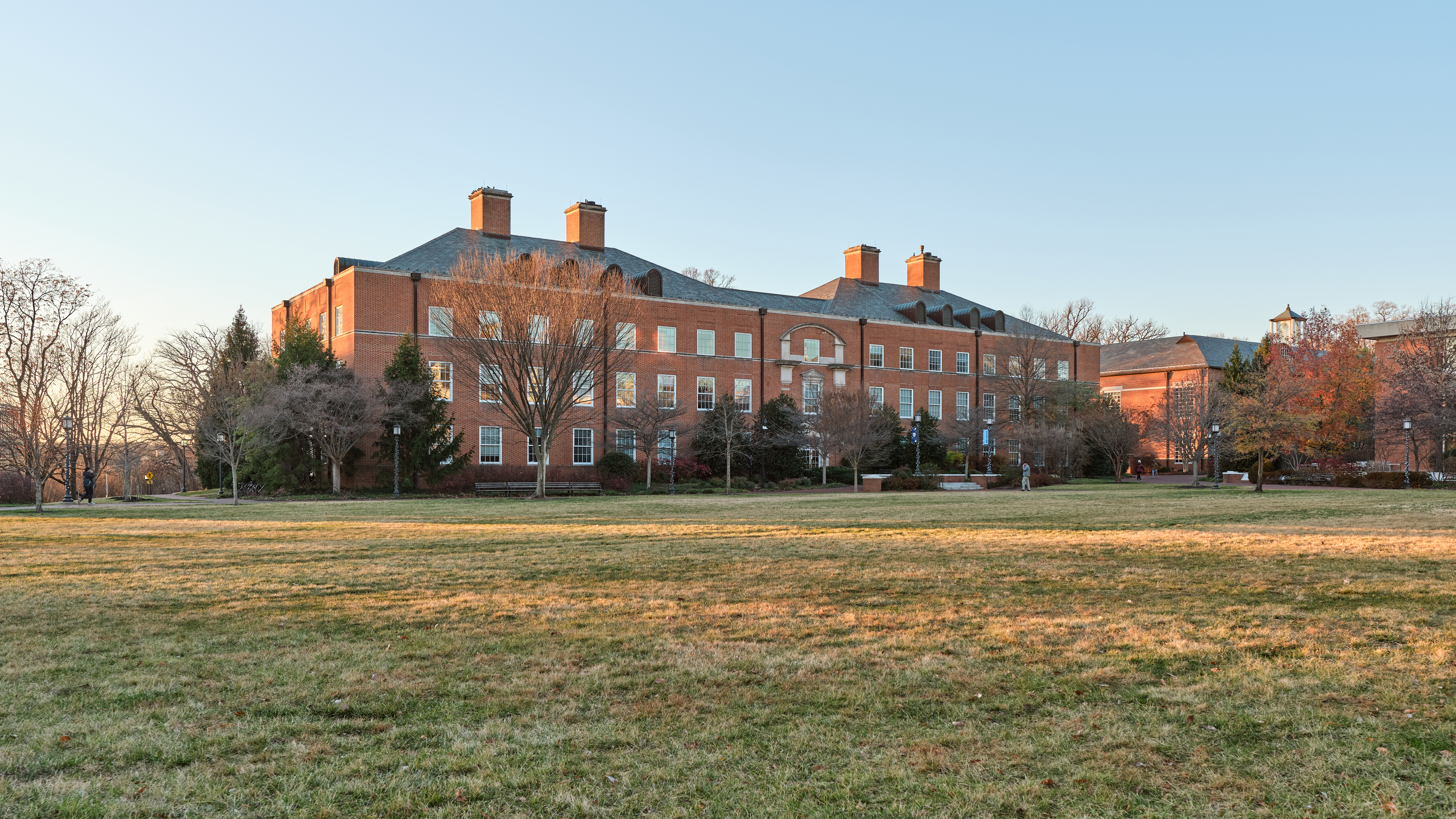

The Department of Biomedical Engineering is an academic department at the Whiting School of Engineering and the Johns Hopkins School of Medicine at Johns Hopkins University in Baltimore, Maryland, United States.

== History ==
Biomedical engineering at Johns Hopkins was first established in 1961 as a Division of Biomedical Engineering within the Johns Hopkins University School of Medicine in East Baltimore with Samuel Talbot as the head, followed by Richard J. Johns (1965-1991). In 1961, Johns Hopkins, along with the University of Pennsylvania and the University of Rochester, established the first graduate programs in biomedical engineering. Established in the School of Medicine, the program at Johns Hopkins is the oldest continually-funded PhD program in the nation.

In 1981, Johns and David VandeLinde, then Dean of the Whiting School of Engineering, launched the undergraduate program at the Homewood campus; the first undergraduate program director was Eric D. Young. This is now the largest undergraduate program within the Whiting School of Engineering. The department continues to be shared jointly between the two schools.

List of directors
Name	Tenure
Samuel Talbot	–1964
Richard J. Johns	1965–1991
Murray B. Sachs	1992–2006
Elliot McVeigh	2007–2015
Les Tung (Interim Director)	2016-2017
Michael I Miller	2017-

=== Founding faculty ===
The original eight faculty members who founded the Department of Biomedical Engineering were specialists in neuroscience and the science of cardiovascular engineering. This founding era gave rise to some of the earliest works in computational neuroscience, exemplified by the application of control theory to the neural basis of eye movements, understanding the control of the strength of heart muscle contractions, Johns' articulation of what has come to be known as Systems Biology, the early neural codes of complex auditory stimuli forming the basis for modern cochlear implants, and somatosensory codes forming the basis for modern tactile prostheses.

=== The Whitaker Foundation Years ===
In 2000, Johns Hopkins University received an award from the Whitaker Foundation, enabling the hiring of 10 tenure line faculty with principal appointments in the Whiting School of Engineering. The department has since developed with the formation of several Centers of Excellence and Institutes including the Center for Imaging Science (CIS), the Center for Bioengineering Innovation and Design (CBID), and the Institute for Computational Medicine (ICM). During this period, the Johns Hopkins University Translational Tissue Engineering Center (TTEC) and the Carnegie Center for Surgical Innovation were developed, both residing on the School of Medicine campus.

With the Whitaker foundation award, the new Clark Hall was constructed at the Homewood campus.

== Rankings ==
For 30 years, the Johns Hopkins Department of Biomedical Engineering was continuously ranked as the number one undergraduate and graduate Biomedical Engineering program in the United States by U.S. News & World Report.

== Notable faculty ==
- Jennifer Elisseeff - member of the National Academy of Inventors
- Andrew Feinberg (geneticist), Bloomberg Distinguished Professor - genomic engineering, systems biology, member of the American Academy of Arts and Sciences, the National Academy of Medicine, and the National Academy of Sciences
- Taekjip Ha, Bloomberg Distinguished Professor - biomedical imaging, genetic engineering, mechanobiology, molecular-cell engineering, member of the American Academy of Arts and Sciences and the National Academy of Sciences
- Michael I. Miller, Massey Professor and Director - biomedical analytics, biomedical imaging, computational medicine, neural engineering
- Steven L Salzberg, Bloomberg Distinguished Professor - biomedical analytics, genomic engineering
- Sridevi V. Sarma, neural engineering, precision medicine, systems physiology
- Jeffrey H. Siewerdsen, biomedical imaging, biomedical instrumentation, medical robotics, medical technology
- Natalia Trayanova, Murray B. Sachs Professor - computational cardiology, precision medicine, heart rhythm disorders
- Rene Vidal, biomedical analytics, biomedical imaging, computational medicine
- Raimond L. Winslow, Raj and Neera Singh Professor - computational medicine, precision medicine, systems physiology
- Joshua Vogelstein, biomedical imaging, neuroscience, data science, machine learning, graph statistics
- Kathleen E. Cullen - Multisensory integration, motor learning mechanisms, neural prosthesis, computational neuroscience

Other members of the National Academies on the faculty include

- Richard J. Johns - member of the National Academy of Medicine
- Murray B. Sachs - member of the National Academy of Engineering
