= Schlesinger =

Schlesinger is a German surname (in part also Jewish) meaning "Silesian" (Note: from the older regional term Schlesinger; someone from Schlesing (Silesia); in modern Standard German (or Hochdeutsch) a Schlesier is someone from Schlesien) and may refer to:

- Adam Schlesinger (1967–2020), American composer and musician
- Adolf Martin Schlesinger (1769–1838), German founder of A.M. Schlesingers Musikhandlung
- Alan Schlesinger (born 1960), American politician and Republican candidate for the U.S. Senate in Connecticut in 2006
- Alice Schlesinger (born 1988), Israeli Olympic judoka
- Arthur Meier Schlesinger, Sr. (1888–1965), American historian and professor at Harvard University
- Arthur Meier Schlesinger, Jr. (1917–2007), son of the above, American historian, social critic and former John F. Kennedy associate
- Bruno Schlesinger (1876–1962), American German-born conductor and composer who changed his name to "Bruno Walter" in 1911
- Carl Schlesinger (1813–1871), Austrian cellist
- Christina Schlesinger, American artist
- Cory Schlesinger (born 1972), American football player
- David Schlesinger (born 1960), American journalist who is the Editor-in-Chief of Reuters
- Don Schlesinger, American gaming mathematician, author, lecturer and famous blackjack player
- Elyakim Schlesinger (1921–2026), Austrian-born British Orthodox rabbi
- Frank Schlesinger (1871–1943), American astronomer
- Hanan Schlesinger, Israeli rabbi
- Helmut Schlesinger (1924–2024), German economist and President of the Bundesbank
- Hermann Irving Schlesinger (1882–1960), American chemist
- James R. Schlesinger (1929–2014), U.S. Secretary of Defense (1973–1974) and first Secretary of Energy (1977–1979)
- Joe Schlesinger (1928–2019), Canadian television journalist and author
- John Schlesinger (1926–2003), British film director
- Karl Schlesinger (1889–1938), an Austrian-Hungarian economist and banker
- Katharine Schlesinger, British actress
- Kathleen Schlesinger, British musicologist (1862–1953)
- Kurt Schlesinger (1902–1964), a war criminal, head of the Jewish Security Service in Westerbork transit camp
- Leon Schlesinger (1884–1949), American Looney Tunes producer
- Leonard Schlesinger, American economist
- Ludwig Schlesinger (1864–1933), Hungarian-German mathematician
- Marcus Schlesinger, Israeli swimmer
- Patricia Schlesinger (born 1961), German journalist
- Piero Schlesinger (1930–2020), Italian banker and lawyer
- Richard Schlesinger (1900–1968), Australian tennis player.
- Steven W Schlesinger, American attorney and rabbi.
- Romana Schlesinger (born 1986), Slovak LGBT rights activist
- Rudolf Schlesinger (1909–1996), German-born Professor of Comparative Law at Cornell University, Director of the Cornell Common Core Project
- T.E. (Ed) Schlesinger, American engineer and physicist
- Walter Schlesinger (1908–1984), German historian

Things that are named after people with this surname:

- Leon Schlesinger Productions, the 1933 founding name of The Warner Bros. animation division, named after Leon Schlesinger
- Schlesinger (crater), a lunar impact crater on the far side of the Moon
- Schlesinger Building, a skyscraper in Braamfontein, Johannesburg, South Africa
- Schlesinger Institute, Research institute for Jewish medical ethics, named after Falk Schlesinger M.D.
- Schlesinger Library, a research library at the Radcliffe Institute for Advanced Study, Harvard University, named after Arthur M. Schlesinger, Sr.

== See also ==
- Schlessinger
- Shlesinger
- Slesinger
- Slezak
- Slazenger
