= Sri Sarma =

American engineer

Sridevi Sarma
- Born: 1972 (age 53–54)
- Education: Massachusetts Institute of Technology; Cornell University
- Scientific career
- Workplaces: Johns Hopkins University, Whiting School of Engineering; Department of Biomedical Engineering
- Thesis: Finite-rate control : stability and performance (2006)
- Academic advisors: Munther A. Dahleh; Emery Brown
- Website: sarmalab.icm.jhu.edu

Sridevi Sarma (born 1972) is an American biomedical engineer known for her work in applying control theory to improve therapies for neurological disorders such as Parkinson's disease and epilepsy. She is vice dean for graduate education of the Johns Hopkins University Whiting School of Engineering, associate director of the Johns Hopkins Institute for Computational Medicine, and an associate professor in the Johns Hopkins Department of Biomedical Engineering.

== Early life and education ==
Sarma undertook her undergraduate studies at Cornell University where she received a BS in electrical engineering in 1994. She received her SM and PhD degrees in electrical engineering and computer science from the Massachusetts Institute of Technology in 1997 and 2006. From 2000 to 2003 she took a leave of absence to start a data analytics company. She was a postdoctoral fellow in the MIT Department of Brain and Cognitive Science from 2006 to 2009.

While pursuing her PhD in electrical engineering and computer science, Sarma took a course on neural systems. During this time, she conducted a three-day case study on her aunt, who had early-onset Parkinson’s disease, as part of a class project. She recalled the experience to profoundly affect her, as she observed the impact of Parkinson’s on both her aunt and caretaking uncle. The exposure significantly influenced Sarma's interest in the application of control theory to treatments for neurological disorders.

== Research ==
Sarma joined the Johns Hopkins Department of Biomedical Engineering as a professor in 2009. She was appointed as associate director of the Johns Hopkins Institute for Computational Medicine in 2017, and vice dean of graduate education for the JHU Whiting School of Engineering in 2019. She is best known for her research combining learning theory and control systems with neuroscience to create translational work aimed at improving therapies for neurological disorders, including Parkinson's disease (PD) and epilepsy.

=== Parkinson's Disease ===
Sarma’s early work focused on improving therapies for PD, primarily studying the effects of deep brain stimulation (DBS) therapy as a method of PD treatment. DBS is a rapidly growing treatment used for Parkinson’s disease, but is limited by a single signal type, a single stimulus location, and power efficiency. Sarma’s research team developed the first computational model of the motor network under PD conditions. DBS was previously thought to block abnormal activity seen in PD with continuous, high-frequency signals. Sarma’s research team discovered that, contrary to this prevailing belief, high-frequency DBS restores pathological network dynamics in the brain.

=== Epilepsy ===
Sarma’s research into epilepsy centers on the development of advanced computational tools aimed at improving the diagnosis and treatment of epileptic seizures. Epilepsy affects over 60 million people worldwide, with approximately 30% of patients unresponsive to AEDs. In these patients, surgery is the standard of care, which involves identifying and removing the brain's epileptogenic zone (EZ) from where seizures originate. However, accurately localizing has proven to be a significant research challenge. Seizure recurrence occurs in 50% of patients due to misidentification of the EZ.

Among Sarma’s most notable contributions is the development of EZTrack, a computational tool designed to accurately identify epileptogenic zones using electroencephalogram (EEG) data. EZTrack has demonstrated substantial improvements in clinical settings, predicting surgical outcomes with 25% greater accuracy than clinicians and achieving a 100% accuracy rate in predicting surgical failures.

Sarma is also investigating control theory techniques to develop faster and more accurate methods for diagnosing epilepsy. Current diagnostic procedures often require at least four routine EEGs, which are both costly and time-consuming, leading to delays in treatment. Additionally, these procedures can result in misdiagnosis, particularly in patients with psychogenic non-epileptic seizures (PNES) and syncope. Sarma's research aims to create effective system modeling techniques that can diagnose epilepsy within minutes of the first EEG recording.

Sarma is additionally researching methods to measure the efficacy of the Responsive NeuroStimulation (RNS) system. RNS is an implantable device that electrically stimulates the brain to prevent seizures. Although RNS has been effective in reducing seizures in 50% of patients, its success depends on accurately localizing the EZ and optimizing stimulation patterns. Beyond enhanced EZ localization through EZTrack, Sarma's lab is developing methods to predict a patient’s responsiveness to RNS treatment prior to the device's implantation and to continue measuring the efficacy of RNS treatment after implantation.

=== Chronic Pain ===
Sarma’s lab is also developing an adaptive, model-based closed-loop peripheral nerve stimulation method for the restoration of the dysfunctional pain system back to a healthy state. Chronic pain can result from nerve and tissue injuries and has a prevalence of 11.2% in the US. Prior research into neuromodulation techniques has been limited to open-loop control systems that lack feedback response and closed-loop systems that block essential pain signals. Sarma’s lab is exploring an approach to suppress chronic pain while allowing short-lasting protective acute pain to be transmitted to the brain to be perceived. She is currently developing computational models of the spinal cord's dorsal horn (DH) circuit to predict how various electrical stimulation treatments alter neuronal activity.

=== Presentations ===
Sarma serves on the International Workshop Statistical Analysis of Neuronal Data Committee, has served as associate editor for IEEE Transactions on Neural Systems and Rehabilitation, and was the editor of a 2017 special issue of the Journal of Computational Neuroscience.

Sarma has also appeared as a domain expert on several episodes of the National Geographic TV series, Brain Games.

== Entrepreneurship ==
Sarma serves as President and CEO of Neurologic Solutions, where she is commercializing her work on EZTrack and developing further EEG Analytics tools for epilepsy. In addition to EZTrack, she is also developing EpiScalp, a software analytics tool providing a risk score to diagnose new seizure onset cases.

Sarma is also the executive director of Neurotech Harbor, a technology accelerator focused on advancing the development of medical devices that diagnose, treat, and manage neurological disorders. The accelerator selects high-risk, high-potential projects addressing neurological conditions, and specifically targets equitable and accessible technology solutions. The initiative is part of the National Institutes of Health’s Blueprint MedTech: Incubator Hubs program, and was founded as a partnership between Johns Hopkins University and Howard University.

== Awards and honors ==
- L'Oreal For Women in Science fellow (2008)
- National Science Foundation CAREER Award (2011)
- Presidential Early Career Award for Scientists and Engineers (2012)
- North American Neuromodulation Society Krishna Kumar New Investigator Award (2014)
- Whiting School of Engineering Robert B. Pond Excellence in Teaching Award (2015)
- GE Faculty for the Future Research Fellowship
- Burroughs Wellcome Fund Careers at the Scientific Interface Award
- NIH Outstanding Investigator Award (2023)
