= Nicholas G. Hatsopoulos =

Greek-American computational neuroscientist

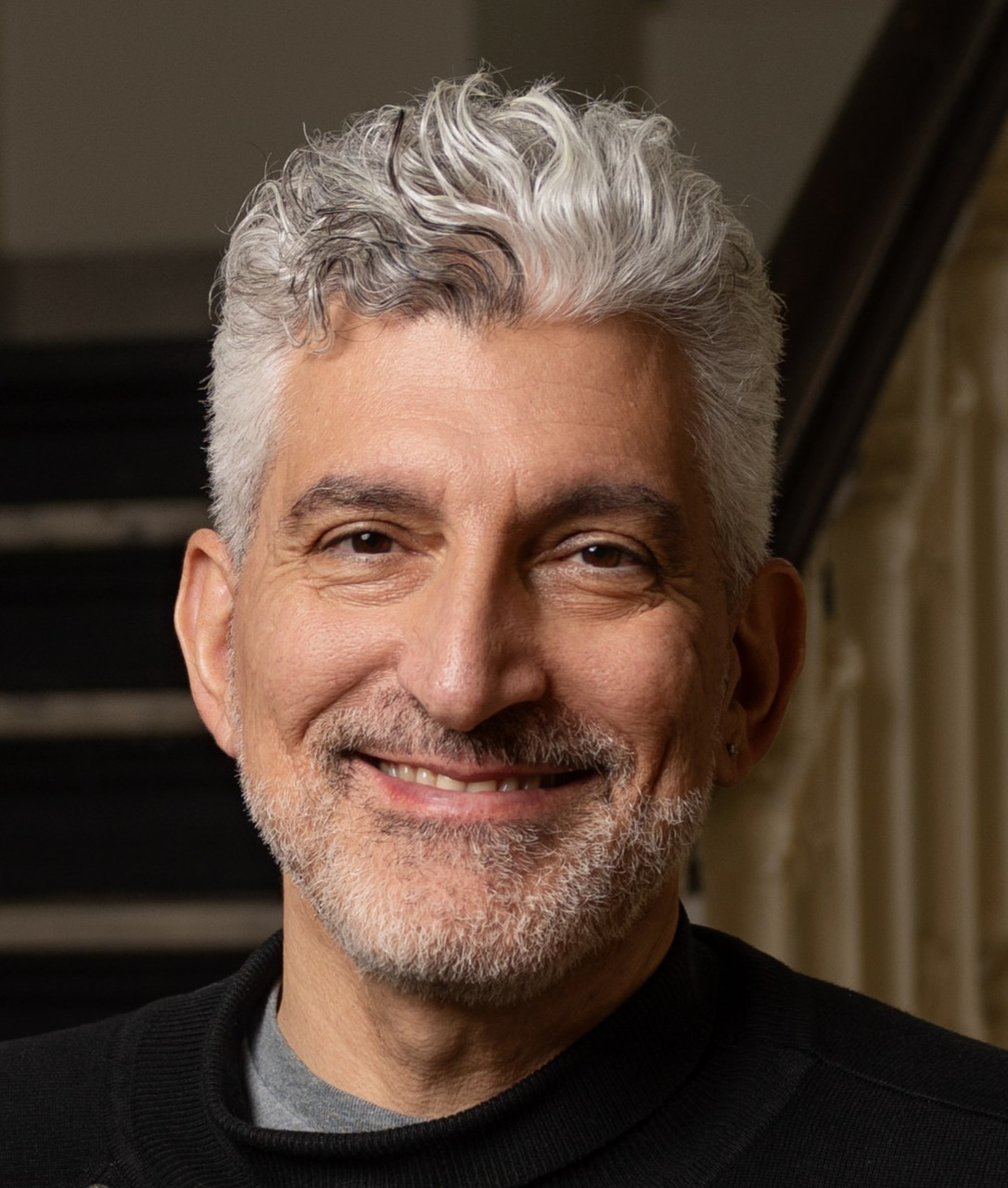
- Born: 1962 (age 63–64)
- Education: B.A. in Physics; Sc.M. in Psychology; Ph.D. in Cognitive Science
- Alma mater: Williams College; Brown University
- Occupation: Computational neuroscientist
- Scientific career
- Workplaces: California Institute of Technology; Brown University; University of Chicago

Nicholas G. Hatsopoulos (born 1962) is a Greek-American computational neuroscientist. He is the A. J. Carlson Professor in the Department of Organismal Biology and Anatomy at the University of Chicago.

He has worked on neural decoding for brain-computer interfaces. This includes a 2002 demonstration of neural control of a computer cursor by monkeys and in developing the technology used in the first human clinical trials of the BrainGate system for people with paralysis.

In 2001 he co-founded Cyberkinetics Neurotechnology Systems to advance neural prosthesis technologies.

== Early life and education ==
Nicholas G. Hatsopoulos is the son of George Hatsopoulos. He completed a B.A. in Physics at Williams College in 1984. He went on to graduate studies at Brown University, earning an Sc.M. in Psychology in 1991 and a Ph.D. in Cognitive Science in 1992.

== Career ==
He has held associate editor positions with IEEE Transactions on Neural Systems and Rehabilitation Engineering and Frontiers in Neuroprosthetics, and has served on the editorial boards of the Journal of Neural Engineering and the Journal of Neurophysiology. He co-founded Cyberkinetics Neurotechnology Systems in 2001 and sat on its board of directors.

== Research ==
=== Motor cortex encoding ===
Together with collaborators, Hatsopoulos has analyzed how populations of neurons in the motor cortex encode movement direction. Work from his group indicates that motor cortex neurons display activity patterns during observed movements that parallel those seen during performed movements. Laboratory studies have further shown that single neurons can represent discrete segments of movement trajectories - termed "pathlets" by the researchers.

Additional research from the lab has addressed beta-range oscillatory activity in the motor cortex and its connection to movement-related information. Later projects have explored how propagating patterns of neural activity - such as changes in beta amplitude and high-gamma signals - relate to the initiation of movement and to kinematic features.

=== Neural interface systems ===
Hatsopoulos has contributed to the development of neural interface systems that decode motor cortex signals to operate external devices. In experiments with monkeys, his team helped demonstrate that animals could learn to control a computer cursor through neural activity after only brief training.

The company he co-founded, Cyberkinetics Neurotechnology Systems, produced technology employed in the first human clinical trials of brain-computer interfaces for people with paralysis. More recent laboratory efforts have tested the addition of artificial somatosensory feedback by means of microstimulation delivered to the somatosensory cortex.

== Selected punlications ==
=== Books ===
- MATLAB for Neuroscientists: An Introduction to Scientific Computing in MATLAB (2009). ISBN 9780123745514
- MATLAB for Neuroscientists: An Introduction to Scientific Computing in MATLAB, 2nd edition (2014). ISBN 9780123838377

=== Articles ===
- Serruya, M. D.; Hatsopoulos, N. G.; Paninski, L.; Fellows, M. R.; Donoghue, J. P. (2002). "Instant neural control of a movement signal". Nature. 416 (6877): 141-142. doi:10.1038/416141a
- Rubino, D.; Robbins, K. A.; Hatsopoulos, N. G. (2006). "Propagating waves mediate information transfer in the motor cortex". Nature Neuroscience. 9 (12): 1549-1557. doi:10.1038/nn1802
- Hatsopoulos, N. G.; Donoghue, J. P. (2009). "The science of neural interface systems". Annual Review of Neuroscience. 32: 249-266. doi:10.1146/annurev.neuro.051508.135241
- Balasubramanian, K.; Papadourakis, V.; Liang, W.; Takahashi, K.; Best, M. D.; Suminski, A. J.; Hatsopoulos, N. G. (2020). "Propagating motor cortical dynamics facilitate movement initiation". Neuron. 106 (3): 526-536. doi:10.1016/j.neuron.2020.02.011
