= Schlessinger =

Other names
- Variant forms: Schleßinger, Šlesingr, Schlesinger, Schlehsinger (Shlezinger, Shleyzinger, Yiddish: שלעזינגער, Hebrew: שלזינגר), Slesinger, Slezak, Ślęzak Similar surnames: Schleußinger (Schleussinger, Schleusinger, from Schleusingen)

Schlessinger is a German surname meaning "from Silesia" (German: Schlesien). The Czechized form of the surname is Šlesingr (Czech pronunciation: [ˈʃlɛsɪŋɡr̩]; feminine: Šlesingrová). Notable people with the surname include:

- Arthur M. Schlesinger Sr. (1888–1965), American historian and professor
- David Schlessinger (born 1936), Canadian-American biochemist, microbiologist and geneticist
- Joseph Schlessinger (born 1945), Israeli-American biochemist
- Laura Schlessinger (born 1947), American radio host and author
- Michael Schlessinger, American mathematician
- Michal Šlesingr (born 1983), Czech biathlete

== See also ==
- Schlessinger Media, educational video distributor
- Schlesinger
- Shlesinger
- Slesinger
