= Whiting School of Engineering =

Engineering school of Johns Hopkins University

Coordinates: 39°19′44″N 76°37′19″W

G.W.C. Whiting School of Engineering
- Type: Private engineering college
- Established: 1913; 113 years ago
- Parent institution: Johns Hopkins University
- Endowment: US$ 124.7 million (FY 2014)
- Dean: T.E. Schlesinger
- Faculty: 249 (including 34 associated research scientists)
- Students: 9,538 (1,993 undergraduate and 7,545 graduate)
- Location: Baltimore, Maryland, United States
- Campus: Urban (Homewood)
- Website: engineering.jhu.edu

The G.W.C. Whiting School of Engineering, commonly the Whiting School or WSE, is the engineering school of Johns Hopkins University, a private research university in Baltimore, Maryland. The school traces its origin to a 1912 act of the Maryland General Assembly and accepted its first undergraduate class in 1913. It existed as the School of Engineering from 1919 until 1966, was absorbed into the School of Arts and Sciences for thirteen years, and was re-established in 1979 under its current name. It is based on the university's Homewood Campus and is organized into nine academic departments and an Engineering for Professionals division for part-time and online graduate study.

== History ==
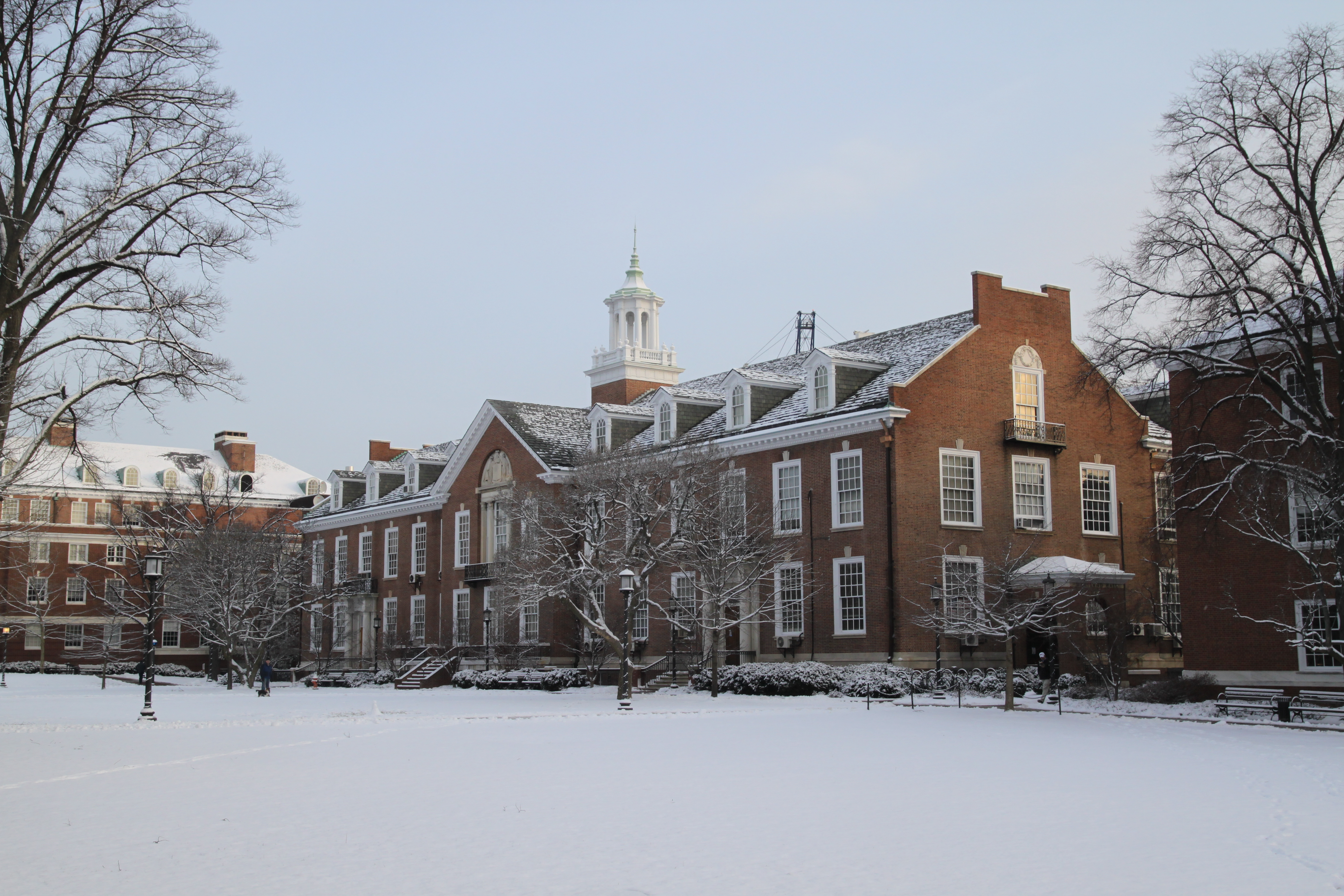
Maryland Hall, the first building constructed for engineering at Homewood, opened in 1914 and was renamed in 1931.

=== Background and founding (1886 to 1919) ===
Engineering instruction at Johns Hopkins began under the physics department, which from 1886 to 1899 offered a two-year Proficiency in Applied Electricity certificate at the request of local employers, particularly the Baltimore and Ohio Railroad. The certificate produced 91 graduates over its thirteen years, among them John Boswell Whitehead, who later led the campaign to establish a formal engineering program at Hopkins.

In 1912 the Maryland General Assembly passed the Technical School Bill, which appropriated $600,000 to establish a Department of Applied Science and Advanced Technology at Hopkins and provided $50,000 annually in scholarships for Maryland residents. Twenty-seven students enrolled that fall. The university accepted its first undergraduate engineering class the following year; 1913 is the date used by the school as its founding. The Mechanical and Electrical Engineering Building, the first structure on the Homewood campus dedicated to engineering, opened in 1914 and was renamed Maryland Hall in 1931 to acknowledge the state's role in funding the program. Major General George Washington Goethals, chief engineer of the Panama Canal, delivered the keynote at the building's dedication in May 1915. The first three engineering degrees were awarded that year.

=== School of Engineering (1919 to 1966) ===
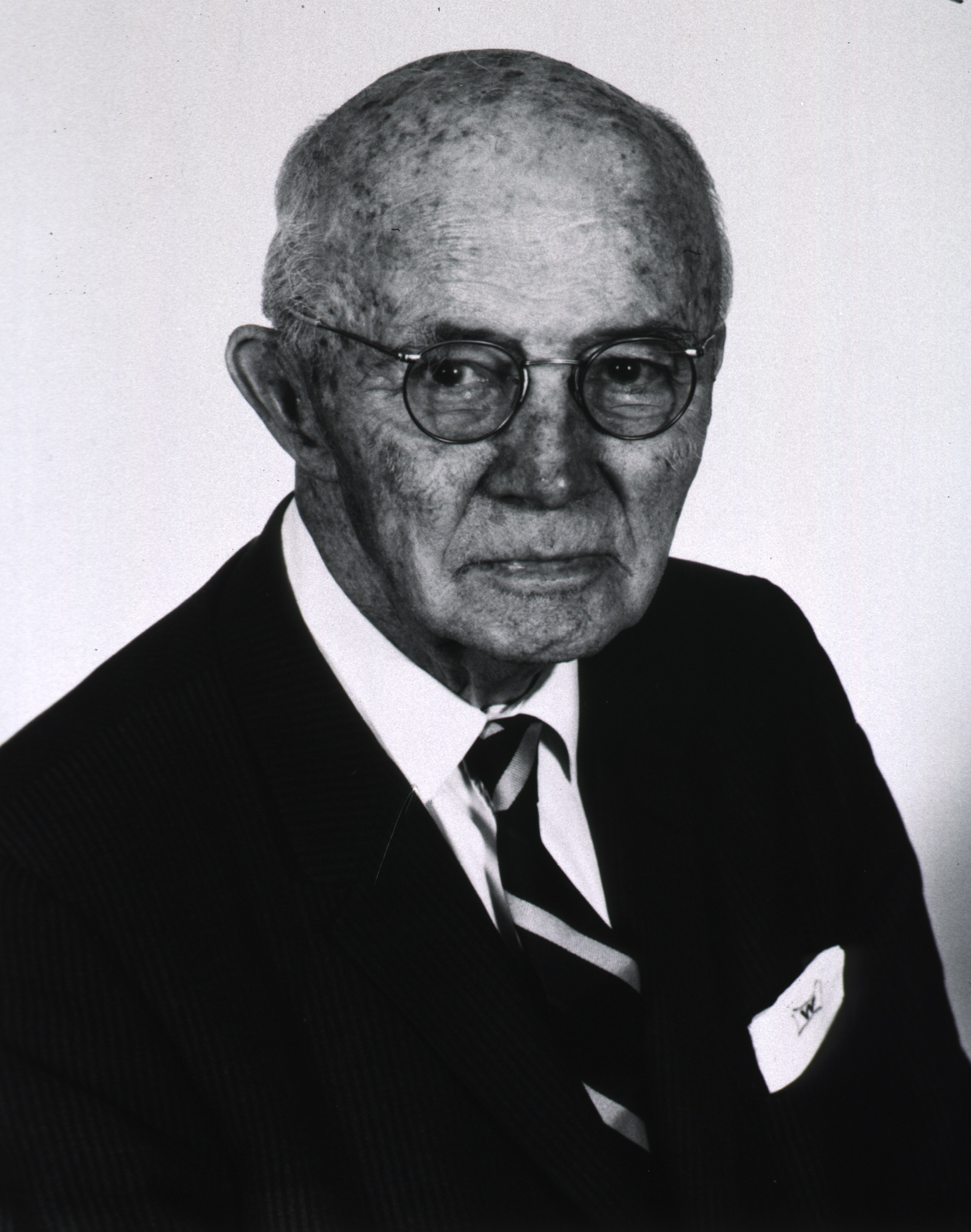
William B. Kouwenhoven, the school's second dean (1938 to 1953).

The Department of Engineering was elevated to the School of Engineering in 1919, and Whitehead was appointed its first dean the following year. A 1934 American Council on Education survey rated the Hopkins department of electrical engineering among the three strongest in the United States. By 1937 more than 1,000 students had earned engineering degrees from the school. Whitehead was succeeded as dean in 1938 by William B. Kouwenhoven, who in subsequent research at Hopkins co-developed the closed-chest cardiac defibrillator and received the Lasker–DeBakey Clinical Medical Research Award in 1973. Kouwenhoven retired in 1953 and was followed by Robert H. Roy, an industrial engineer and 1928 alumnus. By 1946 the school was organized into six departments.

In 1961, in what historian Mary Ruth Yoe described as a curricular shift away from applied practice, the school was renamed the School of Engineering Sciences. University president Milton S. Eisenhower said the change was intended to ensure that Hopkins continued to produce engineers who were "truly educated and creative individuals, not merely cogs in an increasingly complex industrial machine." Five years later, in 1966, the engineering school was dissolved as a separate division and merged with the Faculty of Philosophy to form the School of Arts and Sciences.

=== Whiting School (1979 to present) ===
The engineering programs were re-established as a separate academic division in spring 1978, with formal operation beginning in 1979. The effort was led by trustee and alumnus Willard Hackerman, who helped secure a naming gift from the estate of George William Carlyle Whiting, co-founder of The Whiting-Turner Contracting Company. The new division was the first named school at Johns Hopkins.

V. David VandeLinde, an electrical engineering professor on the Hopkins faculty, was appointed founding dean and held the position until 1992; he later served as vice-chancellor of the University of Bath and the University of Warwick. Subsequent deans were Don P. Giddens (1992 to 1997), Ilene Busch-Vishniac (1998 to 2003), and Nicholas P. Jones, who served until 2013. T. E. "Ed" Schlesinger, previously head of electrical and computer engineering at Carnegie Mellon University, became the Benjamin T. Rome Dean on January 1, 2014, and was reappointed to a second term in 2018.

== Campus and facilities ==
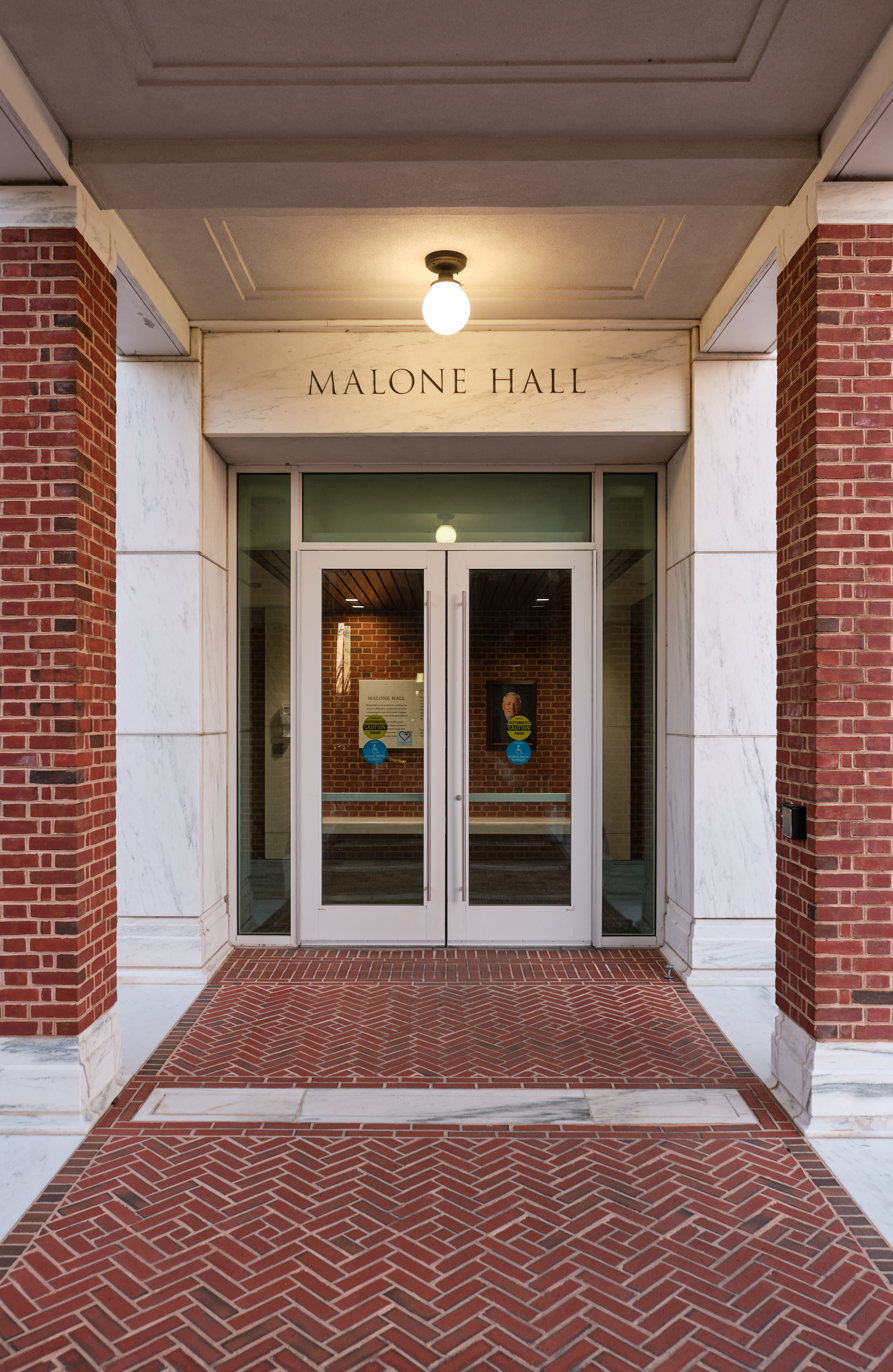
Malone Hall, dedicated in 2014, houses the Department of Computer Science and several research institutes.

The school occupies the southern half of the Homewood Campus. Its older facilities include Maryland Hall (1914) and Latrobe Hall (1916), both renamed in 1931, together with the Krieger and Shaffer additions and the New Engineering Building, which opened behind Shaffer Hall in 1988 and was the first engineering structure built on the campus since the Radiation Laboratory in 1961.

The Alonzo G. and Virginia G. Decker Quadrangle, dedicated in 2007, added a second cluster of engineering facilities at the southern edge of the campus. Hackerman Hall, completed in 2008 as the Computational Science and Engineering Building, was renamed in 2010 in recognition of Willard Hackerman and Lillian Hackerman; it houses the Institute for Computational Medicine, the Center for Language and Speech Processing, and the Laboratory for Computational Sensing and Robotics. Adjacent Malone Hall, a 69,000-square-foot research building dedicated in October 2014, was funded by a $30 million gift from alumnus John C. Malone and described by the university as the largest single donation in the school's history at the time of the pledge in 2010. Malone Hall is the home of the Department of Computer Science, the Hopkins Extreme Materials Institute, and the Information Security Institute.

A 2024 commitment of $1 billion from Bloomberg Philanthropies to Johns Hopkins University expanded graduate financial aid across the institution, including in engineering.

== Academics ==
=== Departments ===
The Whiting School comprises nine academic departments:

- Applied Mathematics and Statistics
- Biomedical Engineering (joint with the School of Medicine)
- Chemical and Biomolecular Engineering
- Civil and Systems Engineering
- Computer Science
- Electrical and Computer Engineering
- Environmental Health and Engineering, joint with the Bloomberg School of Public Health and formed in 2016 from the former Department of Geography and Environmental Engineering
- Materials Science and Engineering
- Mechanical Engineering

The school also operates an Engineering for Professionals division, which according to the university enrolls more than 6,000 part-time students and offers more than 25 fully online master's programs.

=== Rankings ===
In its 2024 graduate rankings, U.S. News & World Report placed the Whiting School 14th overall among American engineering schools and ranked the biomedical engineering program first in its specialty. Johns Hopkins has held the top biomedical engineering position in the magazine's rankings consistently since the program's growth in the 1980s. In the 2026 U.S. News online program rankings, the Engineering for Professionals division placed sixth overall and second in the combined category covering artificial intelligence, computer science, cybersecurity, data science, and information systems engineering.

== Notable people ==
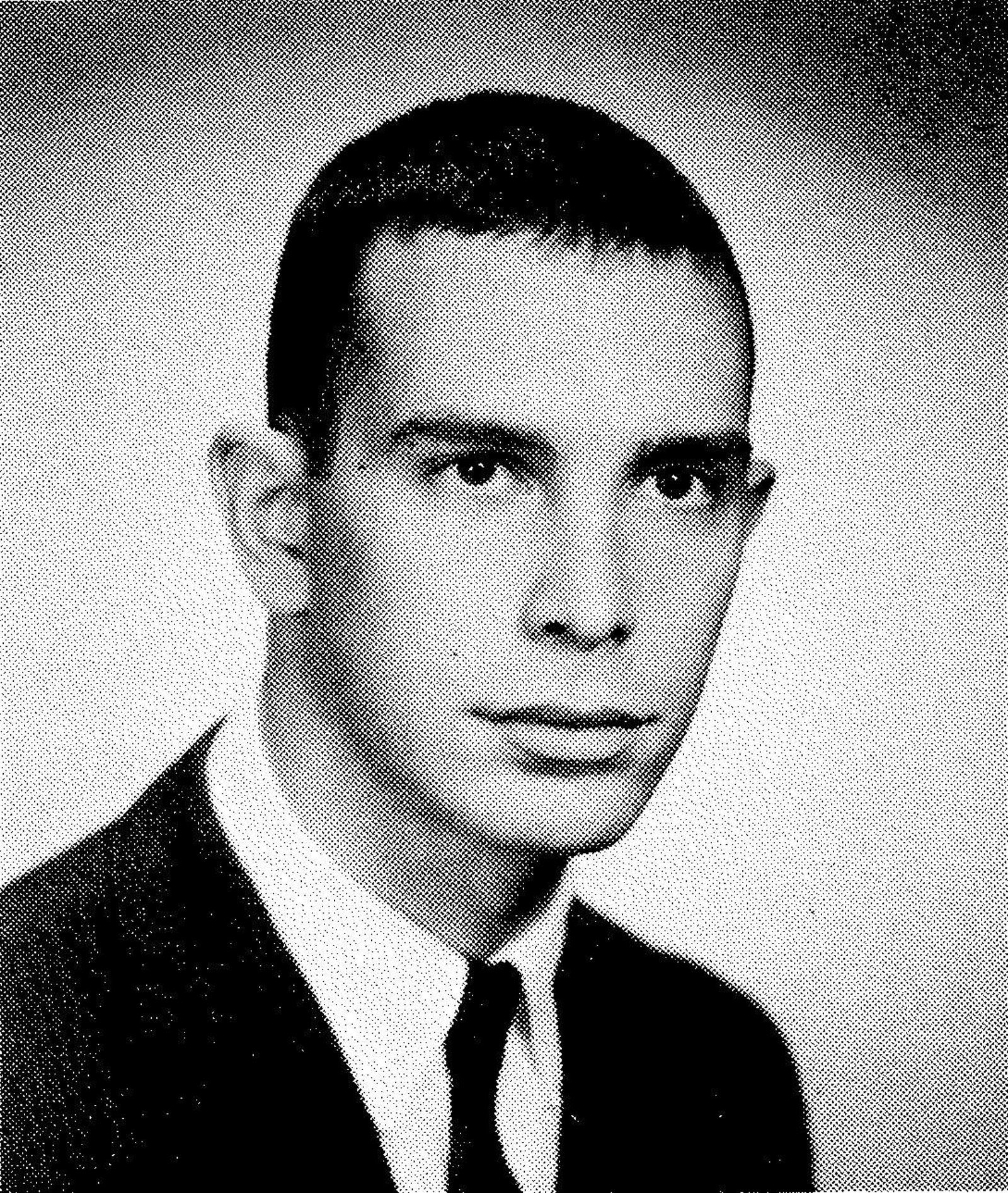
Michael Bloomberg in his 1964 Hopkins yearbook portrait, taken the year he received a B.S. in electrical engineering.

- Michael Bloomberg (B.S. 1964, electrical engineering), founder of Bloomberg L.P., mayor of New York City from 2002 to 2013, and a 2020 candidate for the Democratic presidential nomination
- Willard Hackerman (B.S. 1938), president and CEO of Whiting-Turner from 1955 to 2014; led the alumni effort to re-establish the engineering school in 1979
- William B. Kouwenhoven, dean of the School of Engineering from 1938 to 1953; co-developer of the closed-chest cardiac defibrillator and recipient of the Lasker–DeBakey Clinical Medical Research Award
- John C. Malone (M.S. 1964, Ph.D. 1969), former CEO of Tele-Communications Inc. and chairman of Liberty Media
- Percy A. Pierre (Ph.D. 1967), engineer and university administrator; the first African American to earn a Ph.D. in electrical engineering in the United States
- Bill Stromberg, former chairman and CEO of T. Rowe Price
- V. David VandeLinde, founding dean of the Whiting School (1979 to 1992); subsequently vice-chancellor of the University of Bath and the University of Warwick
- John B. Whitehead, the school's first dean and a 1941 recipient of the IEEE Edison Medal
- Abel Wolman (B.S. 1915), pioneer of municipal water chlorination and modern sanitary engineering
