= Shlesinger =

Shlesinger is a surname derived from Schlesien, the German name for Silesia.

Notable people with this surname include:

- Bernard Shlesinger (born 1960), American bishop
- Iliza Shlesinger (born 1983), American comedian
- Michael F. Shlesinger (born 1948), American physicist
- Miriam Shlesinger (1947–2012), US-Israeli linguist

== See also ==
- Schlesinger
- Schlessinger
- Slesinger
