= Michael I. Miller =

American biomedical engineer and neuroscientist

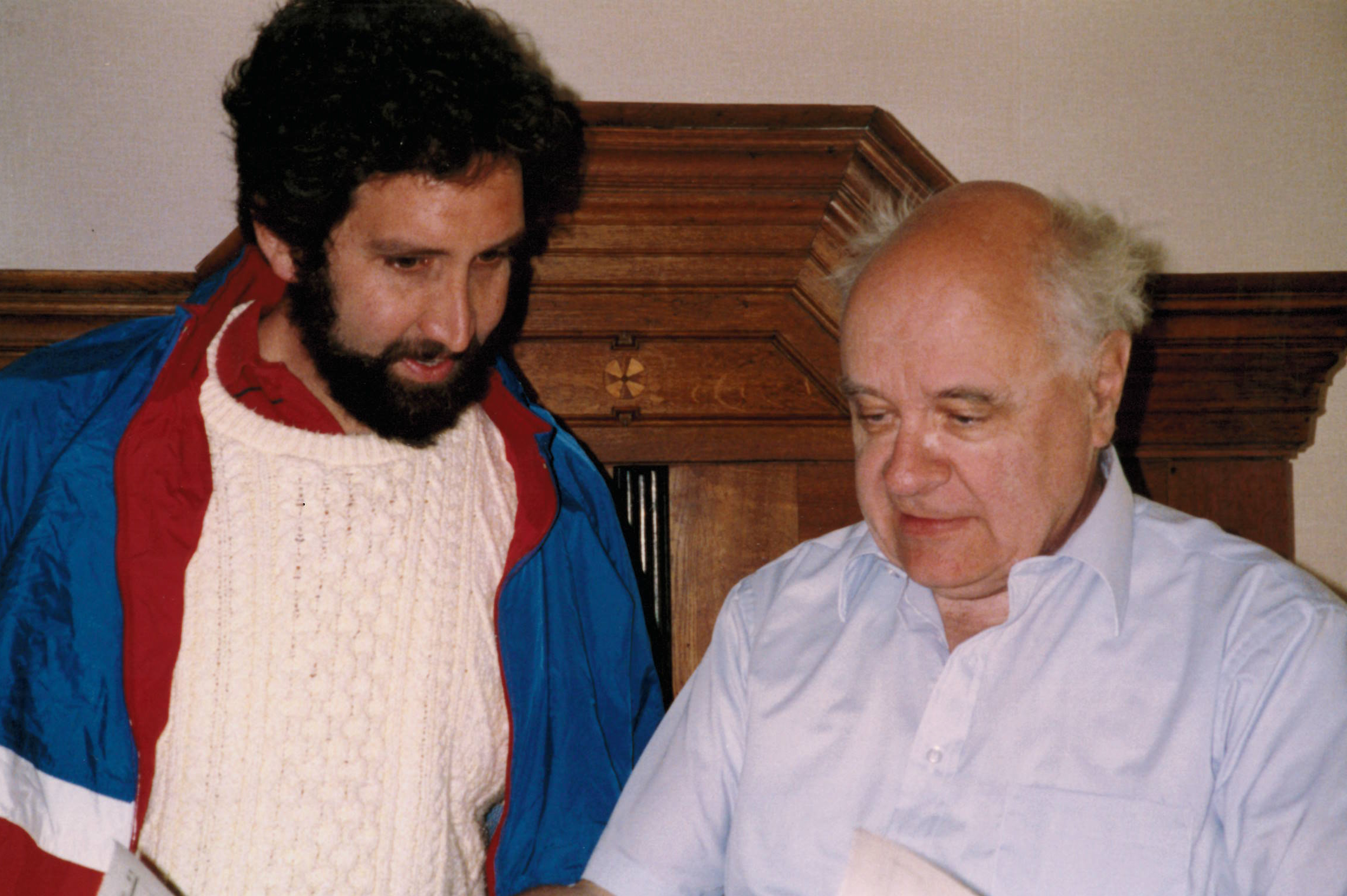
- Michael I. Miller (left) and Ulf Grenander in Mittag-Leffler Institute in Stockholm, Sweden circa summer 1995.
- Born: 1955 (age 70–71); Brooklyn, New York, United States
- Education: The State University of New York at Stony Brook; Johns Hopkins University
- Known for: Computational anatomy
- Spouse: Elizabeth Patton Miller
- Children: 1
- Awards: Presidential Young Investigator Award; Johns Hopkins University Gilman Scholar; IEEE Elected Fellow
- Scientific career
- Fields: Biomedical Engineering; Neuroscience; Pattern Theory
- Workplaces: Washington University in St. Louis; Johns Hopkins University
- Thesis: Statistical Coding of Complex Speech Stimuli in the Auditory Nerve (1983)
- Doctoral advisor: Murray B. Sachs

Michael Ira Miller (born 1955) is an American biomedical engineer and data scientist, and the Bessie Darling Massey Professor and Director of the Johns Hopkins University Department of Biomedical Engineering. He worked with Ulf Grenander in the field of Computational Anatomy as it pertains to neuroscience, specializing in mapping the brain under various states of health and disease by applying data derived from medical imaging. Miller is the director of the Johns Hopkins Center for Imaging Science, Whiting School of Engineering and codirector of Johns Hopkins Kavli Neuroscience Discovery Institute. Miller is also a Johns Hopkins University Gilman Scholar.

== Education ==
Miller received his Bachelor of Engineering from The State University of New York at Stony Brook in 1976, followed by a Master of Science degree in 1978 and PhD in biomedical engineering in 1983, both from the Johns Hopkins University.

== Early career ==
He completed postdoctoral research on medical imaging at Washington University in St. Louis with Donald L. Snyder, then chair of the Electrical Engineering department. In 1985, he joined the faculty of Electrical Engineering at Washington University, where he was later named the Newton R. and Sarah Louisa Glasgow Wilson Professor in Engineering. During his early years at Washington University, Miller received the Presidential Young Investigator Award. From 1994 to 2001, Miller was a visiting professor at Brown University's Division of Applied Mathematics, where he worked with Ulf Grenander on image analysis.

In 1998, Miller joined the Department of Biomedical Engineering at Johns Hopkins University as the director of the Center for Imaging Science. He was later named the Herschel and Ruth Seder Professor of Biomedical Engineering, and was appointed by Johns Hopkins University President Ronald J. Daniels as one of 17 inaugural University Gilman Scholars in 2011. In 2015, Miller became the co-director of the newly established Kavli Institute for Discovery Neuroscience. In 2017, Miller was named the Massey Professor and Director of the Department of Biomedical Engineering at the Johns Hopkins University. In 2019, he was elected as an IEEE Fellow.

== Academic career ==
=== Neural coding ===
Miller did his doctoral work on neural codes in the Auditory system under the direction of Murray B. Sachs and Eric D. Young in the Neural Encoding Laboratory at Johns Hopkins University. With Sachs and Young, Miller focused on rate-timing population codes of complex features of speech including voice-pitch and consonant-vowel syllables encoded in the discharge patterns across the primary auditory nerve. These neural codes were one of the scientific works discussed as the strategy for neuroprosthesis design at the 1982 New York Academy of Science meeting on the efficacy and timeliness of Cochlear implants.

=== Medical imaging ===
Miller's work in the field of brain mapping via Medical imaging, specifically statistical methods for iterative image reconstruction, began in the mid-1980s when he joined Donald L. Snyder at Washington University to work on time-of-flight positron emission tomography (PET) systems being instrumented in Michel Ter-Pogossian's group. With Snyder, Miller worked to stabilize likelihood-estimators of radioactive tracer intensities via the method-of-sieves . This became one of the approaches for controlling noise artifacts in the Shepp-Vardi algorithm in the context of low-count, time-of-flight emission tomography. It was during this period that Miller met Lawrence (Larry) Shepp, and he subsequently visited Shepp several times at Bell Labs to speak as part of the Henry Landau seminar series.

=== Pattern theory and computational anatomy ===
During the mid-1990s, Miller joined the Pattern Theory group at Brown University and worked with Ulf Grenander on problems in image analysis within the Bayesian framework of Markov random fields. They established the ergodic properties of jump-diffusion processes for inference in hybrid parameter spaces, which was presented by Miller at the Journal of the Royal Statistical Society as a discussed paper. These were an early class of random sampling algorithms with ergodic properties proven to sample from distributions supported across discrete sample spaces and simultaneously over the continuum, likening it to the extremely popular Gibb's sampler of Geman and Geman.

Grenander and Miller introduced Computational anatomy as a formal theory of human shape and form at a joint lecture in May 1997 at the 50th Anniversary of the Division of Applied Mathematics at Brown University, and in a subsequent publication. In the same year with Paul Dupuis, they established the necessary Sobolev smoothness conditions requiring vector fields to have strictly greater than 2.5 square-integrable, generalized derivatives (in the space of 3-dimensions) to ensure that smooth submanifold shapes are carried smoothly via integration of the flows. The Computational anatomy framework via diffeomorphisms at the 1mm morphological scale is one of the de facto standards for cross-section analyses of populations. Codes now exist for diffeomorphic template or atlas mapping, including ANTS, DARTEL, DEMONS, LDDMM, StationaryLDDMM, all actively used codes for constructing correspondences between coordinate systems based on sparse features and dense images.

=== Shape and form ===
David Mumford appreciated the smoothness results on existence of flows, and encouraged collaboration between Miller and the École normale supérieure de Cachan group that had been working independently. In 1998, Mumford organized a Trimestre on "Questions Mathématiques en Traitement du Signal et de l'Image" at the Institute Henri Poincaré; from this emerged the ongoing collaboration on shape between Miller, Alain Trouve and Laurent Younes. They published three significant papers together over the subsequent 15 years; the equations for geodesics generalizing the Euler equation on fluids supporting localized scale or compressibility appeared in 2002, the conservation of momentum law for shape momentum appeared in 2006, and the summary of Hamiltonian formalism appeared in 2015.

=== Neurodegeneration in brain mapping ===
Miller and John Csernansky developed a long-term research effort on neuroanatomical phenotyping of Alzheimer's disease, Schizophrenia and mood disorder. In 2005, they published with John Morris an early work on predicting conversion to Alzheimer's disease based on clinically available MRI measurements using diffeomorphometry technologies. This was one of the papers that contributed to a deeper understanding of the disorder in its earlier stages and the recommendations of the working group to revise the diagnostic criteria for Alzheimer's disease dementia for the first time in 27 years.

In 2009, the Johns Hopkins University BIOCARD project was initiated, led by Marilyn Albert, to study preclinical Alzheimer's disease. In 2014, Miller and Younes demonstrated that the original Braak staging of the earliest change associated to the entorhinal cortex in the medial temporal lobe could be demonstrated via diffeomorphometry methods in the population of clinical MRIs, and subsequently that this could be measured via MRI in clinical populations upwards of 10 years before clinical symptoms appeared.

== Books ==
- Snyder, Donald L.; Miller, Michael I. (1991). Random Point Processes in Time and Space. Springer. ISBN 978-0-19-929706-1.
- Grenander, Ulf; Miller, Michael (2007). Pattern Theory: From Representation to Inference. Oxford University Press. ISBN 978-0-19-929706-1.
