= Slesinger =

Slesinger is a German surname. Notable people with the surname include:

- Bruce Slesinger, drummer with the punk music band Dead Kennedys
- Stephen Slesinger (1901–1953), American radio/television/film producer and comic book character creator

== See also ==
- Schlesinger
- Schlessinger
- Shlesinger
