= Natalia Trayanova =

Professor of biomedical engineering

- Education: Sofia University (MS, 1982); Bulgarian Academy of Sciences (PhD, 1986)
- Awards: NIH Director's Pioneer Award (2013); Heart Rhythm Society Distinguished Scientist Award (2019)
- Scientific career
- Institutions: Johns Hopkins University University of Oxford; Tulane University Duke University

Natalia Trayanova is a Bulgarian-American physicist and biomedical engineer who holds the Murray B. Sachs Professorship in Biomedical Engineering and a professor of medicine at Johns Hopkins University. She codirects the Alliance for Cardiovascular Diagnostic and Treatment Innovation (ADVANCE).

== Early life and education ==
Trayanova's father was a physiologist and director of the Biophysics Institute in Bulgaria. Her mother was a professor of economics. She studied physics at Sofia University, graduating in 1982. She earned a PhD from the Bulgarian Academy of Sciences in 1986, where she studied skeletal muscle fibre trans-membrane potential

== Research and career ==
After completing her Ph.D., Trayanova moved to the United States to pursue an academic career in biomedical engineering. In 1986, she joined Duke University as a researcher working with Professor Robert Plonsey on heart rhythm dysfunction. In 1995 she was appointed associate professor at Tulane University, where she was earned several awards for teaching excellence. Her early forays into heart modeling were pioneering and focused on mechanistic insight into clinically-relevant conditions, but the basic-science nature of the work failed to capture the interest of clinical researchers and medical professors. In 2002, she was awarded a Fulbright Program Visiting Professorship and spent January through May of 2002 at the University of Oxford.

In 2006, Trayanova was recruited to Johns Hopkins University as a professor in the Johns Hopkins Department of Biomedical Engineering and Institute for Computational Medicine. Her work considers computational simulations of the heart. She was elected a Fellow of the Biomedical Engineering Society and American Heart Association in 2010. In 2011 she developed a computational framework that allowed virtual drug screening, simulating the drug-channel interactions and predicting the impact of drugs on electrical activity of the heart.

In 2012, she was named the Murray B Sachs Endowed Chair in the Johns Hopkins Department of Biomedical Engineering. In 2013 she was awarded the National Institutes of Health Director's Pioneer Award, which allowed her to develop a virtual electrophysiology lab. The award gave her $2.5 million over five years to develop patient-specific computational models of the heart, allowing for doctors to provide personalised treatment and diagnoses. She has received extensive support from the Maryland Innovation Initiative. In 2019, she was inducted into the Women in Technology International Hall of Fame, and she also received the 2019 Heart Rhythm Society Distinguished Scientist Award. Also in 2019, she was elected Fellow of the National Academy of Inventors.

She is the Chief Scientific Officer of Cardiosolv Ablation Technologies, a start-up that develops computational tools to help the treatment of ventricular tachycardia. She gave a TED talk in 2017 entitled Your Personal Virtual Heart. She was selected by the National Institutes of Health to take part in a briefing at Capitol Hill looking to defend the federal funding of scientific research. She was elected a Fellow of the International Academy of Medical and Biological Engineering in 2017. She has been featured on Reddit AMA r/science, has been interviewed by the BBC, NPR, the Economist, and has been on the Amazing Things Podcast.
