= Brain Games (2011 TV series) =

American popular science television series

- Presented by: Neil Patrick Harris; Jason Silva; Keegan-Michael Key; Chuck Nice
- Country of origin: United States

Production
- Running time: 25 minutes (seasons 2–6, 9); 50 minutes (seasons 1, 7–8)
- Production companies: Magical Elves Productions; National Geographic Television

Original release
- Network: National Geographic
- Release: October 9, 2011 – March 4, 2022

Brain Games is an American popular science television series that explores cognitive science by focusing on illusions, psychological experiments, and counterintuitive thinking. The series debuted on National Geographic in 2011 as a special. Its return as an original series in 2013 set a record for the highest premiere rating for any National Geographic original series with 1.5 million viewers.

Neil Patrick Harris was the unseen narrator in the first season, replaced by Jason Silva for the remainder of the series as its host and presenter; in addition, sleight-of-hand artist Apollo Robbins has been a frequent consultant and illusionist guest on the show. As time passed, Magician Eric Leclerc took over this role in seasons 4 and 5. The show is interactive, encouraging television viewers, often along with a handful of live volunteers, to engage in visual, auditory, and other cognitive experiments, or "brain games", that emphasize the main points presented in each episode. Experts like Sri Sarma also explain why humans react in a certain way because of the brain.

The series is deemed acceptable for use toward E/I credits, and Litton Entertainment added repurposed reruns of the show to its syndicated Go Time block in fall 2016, and The CW's One Magnificent Morning block in fall 2017.

In December 2019, it was announced that a new format of this series, hosted by Keegan-Michael Key, would premiere on January 20, 2020; neuroscientist Daniel Levitin was brought in as a script consultant for the season to ensure accuracy. Its sneak peek was played on December 29, 2019. On January 17, 2020, a ninth season was announced, but production was delayed due to the COVID-19 pandemic. The ninth season was branded as "Brain Games: On the Road", and was hosted by Chuck Nice and was released on both National Geographic and Disney+.

== Cast ==
=== Main ===
- Neil Patrick Harris – Narrator (season 1)
- Jason Silva – host (season 2–7)
- Keegan-Michael Key – host (season 8)
- Chuck Nice – host (season 9)
- Apollo Robbins – sleight-of-hand artist, "deception specialist" (season 1)
- Eric Leclerc – illusionist
- Max Darwin – illusionist
- Ben Bailey – comedian
- Jay Painter – comedian (season 2 episode 5, "Power of Persuasion")
- Andrei Jikh – cardist (season 4 episode 9, "Patterns")
- Shara Ashley Zeiger – improviser
- Bill Hobbs – author
- Jordan Hirsch – improviser
- Amanda Hirsch – improviser
- Lior Suchard – mentalist (season 8)

=== Featured ===
- Art Shapiro – American University
- Amy Bastian
- Alex Todorov – Princeton University
- Brady Barr
- Brian Scholl – Yale University
- Coren Apicella – psychologist, University of Pennsylvania
- Chess Stetson – Caltech
- Dan Simons
- Daniel Goldstein – Microsoft Research
- Frans de Waal – Emory University
- Forrest Griffin – UFC fighter (season 3 episode 8, "Mind Your Body")
- Helen Fisher – anthropologist, Rutgers University
- Jim Coan – psychologist, University of Virginia
- Jonah Berger – University of Pennsylvania
- Joshua Ackerman – MIT
- Kamran Fallahpour – Brain Resource Center
- Karen Wynn
- Laurie R. Santos – Yale University
- Mark Changizi – theoretical neurobiologist
- Michael Bisping – UFC fighter (season 3 episode 8, "Mind Your Body)
- Rhoda Boone – Food artist (season 4 episode 7, "Food")
- Shankar Vedantam – NPR science correspondent
- Steve Schirripa (season 2 episode 12, "Liar, Liar")
- Susan Carnell – Johns Hopkins University
- Suzanne Dikker – New York University
- Sri Sarma – Asst. Professor, Johns Hopkins University
- Scott Barry Kaufman
- Sara Mednick – University of California
- Harrison Greenbaum – Debunker of Physic Phenomenon (season 4 episode 6, "Superstition")
- Dave Goelz – Dr. Bunsen Honeydew
- David Rudman – Beaker
- Daniel Levitin – Professor, McGill University

== Production ==
National Geographic announced that the show would return as a 2-hour live event in the fall of 2018, but as of April 2020 no live event has been broadcast.

== Episodes ==
=== Series overview ===
Season	Episodes	Originally released	
Season	Episodes	First released	Last released
1	3	October 9, 2011	
2	12	April 22, 2013	June 24, 2013
3	10	November 11, 2013	March 17, 2014
4	12	July 14, 2014	September 5, 2014
5	10	January 19, 2015	March 16, 2015
6	6	June 28, 2015	June 29, 2015
7	6	February 14, 2016	March 20, 2016
8	8	January 20, 2020	March 2, 2020
9	8	February 25, 2022	March 4, 2022

=== Season 1 (2011) ===
Season 1 consists of three one-hour pilot episodes.

No. overall	No. in season	Title	Original release date
1	1	"Watch This!"	October 9, 2011
Explore optical illusions and how our brain can mislead us.
2	2	"Pay Attention!"	October 9, 2011
David Copperfield explores how we use attention throughout our everyday life.
3	3	"Remember This!"	October 9, 2011
Former detective Greg Walsh exposes memory weakness in a staged scenario where a guy's camera is stolen and the eyewitnesses provide conflicting accounts of what happened.

=== Season 2 (2013) ===
Jason Silva takes over as the new host.

No. overall	No. in season	Title	Original release date
Season
4	1	"Focus Pocus"	April 22, 2013
Highlights our misconception that your brain is able to focus on everything important at any given time. Games and scenarios involving football and cheerleaders, and a dinner scenario.
5	2	"It's About Time"	April 22, 2013
Topics on how the brain tries to measure time to speed up or slow down depending on the situation. Games and scenarios involving bullriders, counting intervals, information overload, audio and visual syncing, and a bar trick on snatching money.
6	3	"Motion Commotion"	April 29, 2013
Explore how your brain uses and reacts to motion to make decisions. Games and scenarios where images appear to be moving a certain way when they are not, sleight-of-hand trick with Apollo Robbins, the effect of sound on perception, and when focusing on one object causes ones in the periphery to move differently.
7	4	"Don't Be Afraid"	April 29, 2013
How fear plays into your perceptions on things. Games and scenarios involving trying to remember things when there is fear involved, how sound effects and music can make a scene look scary. Silva plays a Russian-roulette type of game where he experiences the powers of dread. Trying to remember objects in a haunted house. Volunteers go into a dark room and encounter creepy things.
8	5	"Power of Persuasion"	May 6, 2013
How marketers and advertisers manipulate your brain to persuade you. Games and scenarios involving priming, a demonstration involving smashing crates, a guy impersonates a reporter, a game where the viewer chooses the winners of an election based solely on their headshots, and an interview scenario about first impressions.
9	6	"What You Don't Know"	May 13, 2013
Topics on how the brain tricks you into thinking you know more than you do. Silva asks a class to try to figure out how a zipper works, and to draw a bicycle, later showing what those designs would actually look like. A series of questions where the viewer is asked to give a range for their answer and how confident they would be in it. How the brain discards information when focusing on a certain task or assumes words were there when they were not.
10	7	"Battle of the Sexes"	May 20, 2013
Men and women compete in a series of tasks to see whether their gender makes a difference. Games involving color swatches, putting together pieces to make a shape, following directions on a list, matching faces of people, and packing a trunk.
Special
11	N/A	"Blow Your Mind"	May 24, 2013
Season
12	8	"Seeing is Believing"	May 27, 2013
Illusions highlight how your visual perceptions can be surprisingly off. Scenarios and games involving perspective such as the cube of fire, a distorted chair, the Ames room, and a dining table. Basketball players put on goggles that distort their perspective. Puzzles involving the spinning ballerina, Einstein's mask, and how resizing a picture can make it look like two different people. Using anamorphic art to place a cube in a room.
13	9	"You Decide"	June 3, 2013
The subject of decisions. A demonstration of The Paradox of Choice in choosing ice cream. A game where the person chooses one of two people, but ends up talking about the other. Trick questions that can be answered if the person slows down to think about it. A marketing trick where placing an intermediate item in a comparison can trick the person into favoring a certain choice. An experiment where folks end up finding differences among identical items.
14	10	"Use it or Lose it"	June 10, 2013
The brain can be exercised like muscle. Games and puzzles such as connecting nine dots with three lines, using thinking like a child to come up with creative ideas, another sleight-of-hand trick with Robbins, trick questions, using mnemonics to remember people's names, and solving a puzzle using ordinary items in a way they were not originally designed.
15	11	"Illusion Confusion"	June 17, 2013
Optical illusions highlight how powerful our minds can really be.
16	12	"Liar, Liar"	June 24, 2013
Learn how to determine if someone is lying.

=== Season 3 (2013–14) ===
Often games are less intense than season 2 and experiments with random people on the street are done.

No. overall	No. in season	Title	Original release date
17	1	"Battle of the Ages"	November 11, 2013
The mental differences between kids, teens, and adults.
18	2	"In Living Color"	January 6, 2014
Color is simply too complex to simply be black and white.
19	3	"Laws of Attraction"	January 13, 2014
It shows how attractions come down to basic math.
20	4	"Trust Me"	January 20, 2014
It shows how can you find out whom to trust.
21	5	"Stress Test"	January 27, 2014
Explains how much stress you can handle before you "collapse" under pressure.
22	6	"What's Going On?"	February 3, 2014
How things aren't like you think they are.
23	7	"Retrain your Brain"	February 24, 2014
Explains how to make your brain healthier.
24	8	"Mind your Body"	March 3, 2014
Who wins in your life, your body or your brain?
25	9	"In It To Win It"	March 10, 2014
How does competition affect your brain?
26	10	"Follow the Leader"	March 17, 2014
Everyone likes to think they're unique, but like it or not, much of your behavior is influenced by copying other people. Discover whether your brain is a born leader, or a born follower.

=== Season 4 (2014) ===
Graphics get an update. The show introduces new experts and illusionists/magicians.

No. overall	No. in season	Title	Original release date
Special
27	N/A	"Trust Me"	July 6, 2014
28	N/A	"Brain vs. Body"	July 13, 2014
Season
29	1	"Compassion"	July 14, 2014
Discover if you're compassionate or psychopathic in a series of games and experiments.
30	2	"Addiction"	July 14, 2014
Discover how addiction affects your brain, and whether addictions are necessary.
33	3	"Language"	July 21, 2014
Discover how your brain handles language, and why words mean what they do.
34	4	"Risk"	July 21, 2014
Are you risk-taking or cautious? Put your betting skills to the test.
35	5	"Battle of the Sexes 2"	July 28, 2014
It's "male vs. female" again with more games and experiments. And this time, we will have a winner.
36	6	"Superstitions"	July 28, 2014
Discover how your brain is designed to believe in various superstitions.
37	7	"Food"	August 4, 2014
Find out that restaurants trick you, and how the looks of food can turn you away.
38	8	"Anger"	August 11, 2014
Find out what happens in your brain that causes you to get angry.
39	9	"Patterns"	August 18, 2014
Find out how many patterns are in the world, and the pros and cons of patterns.
40	10	"Intuition"	August 25, 2014
What happens when you make "on-the-fly" decisions in life? That's the key of intuition.
41	11	"Mind vs. Body"	September 5, 2014
Compilation episode
42	12	"Brain Trust"	September 5, 2014
Compilation episode

=== Season 5 (2015) ===
Shocking fails, moments, and confusion show how the brain can be easily deterred from its goal. The show abandons the studio in favor of more real-life application.

No. overall	No. in season	Title	Original release date	US viewers (millions)
Special
43	N/A	"Fair Game"	January 12, 2015	N/A
Season
44	1	"Common Sense"	January 19, 2015	0.686
What is Common Sense? Do we really know what it is? Learn how your common sense can either lead you astray or keep you on the right track.
45	2	"Left vs. Right"	January 19, 2015	0.714
Find out the pros and cons about the two sides of the brain and how they help and conflict with each other, and if one side can dominate.
46	3	"Morality"	January 26, 2015	0.773
Who are you most likely to help? The Trolley problem is explored. Are we inherently good or evil? Explore how your brain makes countless moral decisions every day.
47	4	"Money"	February 2, 2015	0.743
Find out why money is so enticing to your brain. Money is present in every corner of our lives – But how does your brain understand it?
48	5	"Paranormal"	February 9, 2015	0.711
Are ghosts real? Are mansions haunted? Find out what's your brain thinking. We'll test your sixth sense.
49	6	"Memory"	February 16, 2015	0.699
Find out how to improve your memory, what it is, why we have it, and why you keep forgetting where to put those keys!
50	7	"Misconceptions"	February 23, 2015	0.702
What is actually true and what's just a misconception? How much of what we think we know is actually true? Let's have the brain be the proof on Brain Games.
51	8	"Peer Pressure"	March 2, 2015	0.575
Find out how others influence you to go with the crowd. If you think you have full control of your thoughts and actions – think again.
52	9	"Logic"	March 9, 2015	0.680
Do you know what to do? Find out how you and your brain don't always meet eye to eye.
53	10	"Faces"	March 16, 2015	0.685
What is so special about a face? Find out why we remember faces so well and why our brains are so highly adept.

=== Season 6 (2015) ===
How the brain acts and thinks is explored. The show continues to abandon the transparent studio for real-life experiences.

No. overall	No. in season	Title	Original release date	US viewers (millions)
Season
54	1	"Positive Thinking"	June 28, 2015	0.524
Do you think half-full or half-empty? Watch to learn how to avoid negative thoughts.
55	2	"Scams"	June 28, 2015	0.489
Watch how easily your brain falls for various scams, but why it's necessary.
56	3	"Sleep"	June 28, 2015	0.476
How does 36 hours without sleep affect your brain? Learn the dangers of sleep deprivation and how you can improve.
57	4	"Perspective"	June 28, 2015	0.481
Learn how a simple shift in perspective can change your entire view of the world.
58	5	"Animal vs Human"	June 29, 2015	0.400
Can a parakeet beat a competitive eater? Watch how humans fare against animals.
59	6	"Imagination"	June 29, 2015	0.475
Learn how important your imagination is to your everyday life. This episode has the fewest games overall and is the last 30-minute episode.
Special
60	N/A	"Try This at Home"	October 26, 2015	N/A
DIY experiments.

=== Season 7 (2016) ===
Episodes are now one hour. The show is told from a real-world perspective with Jason Silva outside in the world with real people. Small games the audience can play along with are shown as well.

No. overall	No. in season	Title	Original release date
61	1	"Meet The Brain"	February 14, 2016
Take a tour and see how the city of London is just like your brain in a series of games.
62	2	"The God Brain"	February 21, 2016
Jason travels to Jerusalem to see how the belief in God may be implanted into our brains.
63	3	"Brains Behaving Badly"	February 28, 2016
Jason heads to New Orleans to see how the seven deadly sins affect your brain.
64	4	"Life Of The Brain"	March 6, 2016
See how your brain changes over the course of your life as Jason heads to the boardwalk on the beach.
65	5	"Super Senses"	March 13, 2016
Jason head to Times Square to see how your senses can trick you, help you, and are there more senses than the basic five?
66	6	"The Survivor Brain"	March 20, 2016
Jason travels to Colorado and shows how you'll need every skill your brain has to survive against all odds in the ultimate brain test.

=== Season 8 (2020) ===
No. overall	No. in season	Title	Original release date
Special
67	N/A	"First Look"	December 29, 2019
Season
68	1	"Male Brain vs. Female Brain"	January 20, 2020
"Battle of the Sexes" returns with celebrity couple Dax Shepard and Kristen Bell as competitors. Lior Suchard makes appearance as the show's master mentalist, while neurologist Cara Santa Maria is also involved in a later game. Bunsen Honeydew and his assistant Beaker also appear.
69	2	"Ted Danson: Fact or Fiction?"	January 20, 2020
The episode discusses about how human can be easily deceived by fake news and false remarks. Playing in the episode is actor Ted Danson. Lior Suchard makes appearance as the show's master mentalist. Also featured are professional poker players Liv Boeree, Wayne Chiang, Igor Kurganov, and Alec Torelli. Bunsen Honeydew and his assistant Beaker also appear.
70	3	"Drew Brees: Performance"	January 27, 2020
The episode discusses about how mind can actually improves the human's performance. Playing in the episode is Super Bowl winner Drew Brees. Lior Suchard makes appearance as the show's master mentalist. Also featured is neurologist Cara Santa Maria who plays in a game. Bunsen Honeydew and his assistant Beaker also appear.
71	4	"Kids vs. Adults"	February 3, 2020
On-screen father-daughter of Black-ish, Anthony Anderson and Marsai Martin, are battling to prove whether kids' or adults' brain are the most reliable. Lior Suchard makes appearance as the show's master mentalist.
72	5	"Jack Black: Music"	February 10, 2020
The episode discusses about how far music can affect human's brain. Playing in the episode is actor-musician Jack Black. Lior Suchard makes appearance as the show's master mentalist. Meghan Trainor plays alongside Black during the final game of the episode. Neuroscientist Daniel Levitin, Neurologist Cara Santa Maria, Kelly Clarkson, Bunsen Honeydew, and Beaker also appear.
73	6	"Mark Cuban: Power and Money"	February 17, 2020
The episode discusses about how a businessman's brain might differ from others'. Playing in the episode is entrepreneur and Dallas Mavericks owner Mark Cuban. Lior Suchard makes appearance as the show's master mentalist. Grandmaster of Memory Nelson Dellis and neuroscientist Daniel Levitin each made an appearance in one game. Actors Tim Allen and Tom Hanks explained the theories in videos. Simon Says professional caller Steve Max conducted a game involving Key, Cuban, and some of the audiences.
74	7	"Rebel Wilson: Love and Attraction"	February 24, 2020
The show explores the subconscious' power when it comes to falling in love. Playing in the episode is Australian actress Rebel Wilson. Lior Suchard makes appearance as the show's master mentalist. Kevin Hart, Bunsen Honeydew, and Beaker also appear.
75	8	"Tiffany Haddish: Movie Magic"	March 2, 2020
The shows explores how movie effects affect viewers' perception. Playing in the episode is actress Tiffany Haddish. Lior Suchard makes appearance as the show's master mentalist. Jordan Peele makes a cameo appearance, while Thomas Middleditch appears in a game's video. Cara Santa Maria meets with Foley artist Dan O'Connell and the video recording of this meeting is played during the show.

=== Season 9: On the Road (2022) ===
The show is now a competition and takes place outside. Teams of 4 compete in challenges. This show is separate from the seasons before it and is a spin-off series.

No. overall	No. in season	Title	Original release date
76	1	"Raise Gospel vs. the Accidentals Quartet"	February 25, 2022
77	2	"PFTP vs. The Awesome Saucers"	February 25, 2002
78	3	"The Gills vs. Tribe Milligan"	February 25, 2022
79	4	"The Faks vs. Team United"	February 25, 2022
80	5	"Hungry Hippocampus vs. the Hot Wheels"	March 4, 2022
81	6	"Taste Budz vs East Coast Swag"	March 4, 2022
82	7	"Team Kodiak vs. Blast from the Past"	March 4, 2022
83	8	"Team Elephants vs. Dad and His Girls"	March 4, 2022

== Awards ==
Year	Award	Category	Result	Ref.
2013	Primetime Emmy Award	Outstanding Informational Series or Special	Nominated	
2015	Imagen Foundation Awards	Best Variety or Reality Show	Nominated	
