= David Jaffray =

Canadian medical physicist (born 1966)

- Born: 1966 (age 59–60); Alberta

Academic background
- Education: BSc, Physics, 1988, University of Alberta; PhD, Medical Biophysics, 1994, Schulich School of Medicine and Dentistry

David Anthony Jaffray (born 1966) is a Canadian medical physicist. He is the inaugural chief technology and digital officer at the University of Texas MD Anderson Cancer Center. Jaffray is the inventor, together with John Wong and Jeffrey Siewerdsen, of on-line volumetric kv-imaging guidance system for radiation therapy.

== Early life and education ==
Jaffray was born in 1966 in Alberta, Canada. He was one of 10 children and grew up on a farm. After completing his Bachelor of Science degree in physics at the University of Alberta, Jaffray was recruited by Jerry Battista to apply to the Schulich School of Medicine and Dentistry.
