= Joshua Vogelstein =

American biomedical engineer (born 1980)

Joshua T. Vogelstein
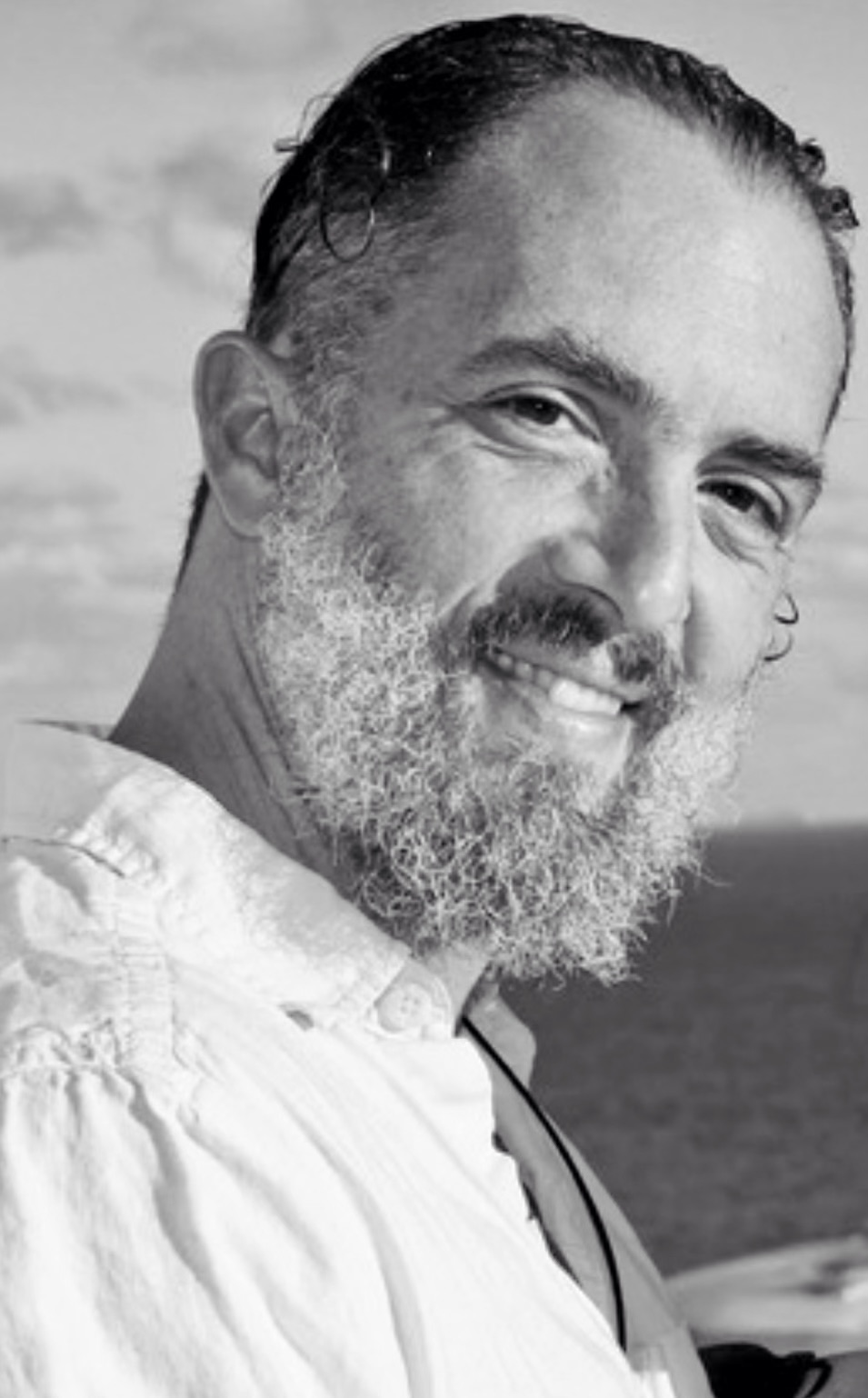
- Vogelstein c. 2014
- Born: Joshua T. Vogelstein; 1980 (age 45–46); United States
- Parent: Bert Vogelstein
- Scientific career
- Education: Washington University in St. Louis; Johns Hopkins University
- Known for: Connectomics, Graph theory
- Spouse: Kathryn Vogelstein
- Children: 3
- Awards: F1000 Prime Recommended (2014), Spotlight, Neural Information Processing Systems (2013), Spotlight, Computational and Systems Neuroscience (2008)
- Workplaces: Johns Hopkins University; Biomedical Engineering
- Thesis: OOPSI: A family of optimal optical spike inference algorithms for inferring neural connectivity from population calcium imaging (2009)
- Doctoral advisor: Eric Young
- Other academic advisors: Carey Priebe
- Website: neurodata.io, jovo.me

Joshua T. Vogelstein is an American biomedical engineer. He is an associate professor of Biomedical Engineering at Johns Hopkins University, where he sits at the Center for Imaging Science. Vogelstein also holds joint appointments in the departments of Applied Mathematics and Statistics, Computer Science, Electrical and Computer Engineering, Biostatistics, and Neuroscience. He has appointments in the Institute for Data Intensive Engineering and Sciences, Institute for Computational Medicine, Kavli Neuroscience Discovery Institute, and the Mathematical Institute for Data Science.

His research focuses primarily on the intersection of natural and artificial intelligence. His group develops and applies high-dimensional nonlinear machine learning methods to biomedical data science challenges. They have published over 100 papers in prominent scientific and engineering journals and conferences including Nature, Science, PNAS, Neurips, and JMLR, with over 10,000 citations and an h-index over 40. They received funding from the Transformative Research Award from NIH, the NSF CAREER award, Microsoft Research, and many other government, for-profit and nonprofit organizations. He has advised over 60 trainees, and taught about 200 students in his eight years as faculty. In addition to his academic work, he co-founded Global Domain Partners, a quantitative hedge fund that was acquired by Mosaic Investment Partners in 2012, and software startup Gigantum, which was acquired by nVidia in early 2022.

== Academic background ==
Vogelstein undertook his undergraduate studies at McKelvey School of Engineering at Washington University in St. Louis, where he received his Bachelor of Science degree in biomedical engineering in 2002. From 2003 to 2009, he studied at Johns Hopkins University, where he received his Master of Science in Applied Mathematics and Statistics and a Ph.D. in neuroscience from the Johns Hopkins School of Medicine, where he developed algorithms for spike detection in calcium imaging.

From 2014 to 2018, Vogelstein was the director of undergraduate studies for the Institute for Computational Medicine. He has also held positions as an endeavor scientist at the Child Mind Institute, a senior research scientist for the departments of statistical sciences and mathematics and neurobiology at Johns Hopkins University, and as affiliated faculty at Duke University.

== Research ==
Vogelstein's research focuses on understanding how massive biomedical datasets are analyzed to discover new knowledge about the function of living systems in health and disease, and how this knowledge can be harnessed to provide improved, more affordable health care. Specifically, his work often focuses on big and wide data in neuroscience, and in particular on the statistics of brain graphs and connectomics.

=== Open Science, Open Data ===
Joshua Vogelstein founded and directs the NeuroData lab, which has created an ecosystem of open-source tools for neuroscientists and hosts a collection of open-source data.

=== Network Statistics and Connectomics ===
Vogelstein's research has focused on connectal coding, an emerging field focusing on the study of how brain structure, rather than brain activity, encodes information; this represents a shift from the traditional study of neural coding. Some of his notable work in this area includes the analysis of the first connectome of an insect brain (that of a Drosophila larva) and his use of machine learning techniques to reveal patterns in larval Drosophila behaviors.

He also studies brain connectivity at the mesoscale, helping develop tools to study how neurons project across entire mammalian brains.

Motivated by this work on connectomes, Vogelstein has also developed statistical and computational methods for networks, including network statistical models, network embedding methods, and methods for comparing and matching networks.

=== Artificial Intelligence ===
Dr. Vogelstein studies various out-of-distribution learning paradigms including meta, transfer, lifelong or continual learning, prospective learning both theoretically and practically. Motivated from his insight from brain study, he aims at making artificial intelligence better, more natural and complementary to human intelligence.

Vogelstein's research use domain knowledge from the fields of neuroscience and machine learning synergistically, aiming to gain deeper insights into natural intelligences (including organisms with brain) as well as building more robust and flexible artificial intelligences. Some key attributes of intelligence that he has researched on include representation capacity and learning efficiency.

== Industry ==
Joshua Vogelstein has been on the advisory board for numerous commercial companies, including Gigantum, Mind-X, and PivotalPath. Vogelstein has also held the position of Chief Data Scientist at Global Domain Partners, LLC. He works extensively with Microsoft Research.
