= Jeffrey Siewerdsen =

American physicist (born 1969)

Jeffrey H. Siewerdsen
- Born: 1969 (age 56–57)
- Education: University of Michigan; University of Minnesota
- Known for: Image-guided surgery
- Awards: Moses and Sylvia Greenfield Award (2015); Sylvia Fedoruk Award (2005); Farrington-Daniels Award (2002); Sylvia Sorkin Greenfield Award (2001)
- Scientific career
- Workplaces: Johns Hopkins University; University of Toronto; William Beaumont Hospital; University of Michigan; University of Minnesota
- Thesis: Signal, Noise, and Detective Quantum Efficiency of a-Si:H Flat-Panel Imagers (1998)
- Doctoral advisor: Larry E. Antonuk
- Website: The I-STAR Lab; The Carnegie Center for Surgical Innovation

Jeffrey Harold Siewerdsen (born 1969) is an American physicist and biomedical engineer who is a Professor of Imaging Physics at The University of Texas MD Anderson Cancer Center as well as Biomedical Engineering, Computer Science, Radiology, and Neurosurgery at Johns Hopkins University. He is among the original inventors of cone-beam CT-guided radiotherapy as well as weight-bearing cone-beam CT for musculoskeletal radiology and orthopedic surgery. His work also includes the early development of flat-panel detectors on mobile C-arms for intraoperative cone-beam CT in image-guided surgery. He developed early models for the signal and noise performance of flat-panel detectors and later extended such analysis to dual-energy imaging and 3D imaging performance in cone-beam CT. He founded the ISTAR Lab (Imaging for Surgery, Therapy, and Radiology) in the Department of Biomedical Engineering, the Carnegie Center for Surgical Innovation at Johns Hopkins Hospital, and the Surgical Data Science Program at the Institute for Data Science in Oncology at The University of Texas MD Anderson Cancer Center.

== Biography and scientific work ==
Jeffrey Siewerdsen did his undergraduate studies at the University of Minnesota in Minneapolis, MN, where he received his Bachelor of Arts degree in Physics and Astrophysics with a minor in Japanese in 1992. His undergraduate research experience included construction and testing of particle detectors for the Soudan 2 proton decay project.

Siewerdsen began graduate studies at the University of Michigan in Ann Arbor, MI, in 1992, working initially in high-energy physics (D0 experiment) under supervision of Professor Homer Neal and earning his Master of Science degree in Physics in 1994.

Siewerdsen's doctoral research involved early development of amorphous silicon Flat panel detector for medical x-ray imaging under the supervision of Professor Larry E. Antonuk. Siewerdsen's work focused on the development of early flat-panel detector systems for diagnostic radiography, fluoroscopy, and mammography as well as megavoltage portal imaging for guidance of radiation therapy. His doctoral dissertation established mathematical models for the signal-to-noise properties (specifically, the modulation transfer function, noise-power spectrum, and detective quantum efficiency) of flat-panel x-ray detectors. His Ph.D. thesis was awarded the Kent M. Terwilliger Prize for Best Doctoral Dissertation in Physics, 1998.

Siewerdsen conducted post-graduate research beginning in 1998 as a research scientist at William Beaumont Hospital in Royal Oak, MI, with Dr. David Jaffray and Dr. John Wong on the topic of cone beam computed tomography (CBCT) for image-guided radiation therapy (IGRT). The Beaumont team produced the first IGRT system for CBCT, beginning with laboratory studies to investigate image quality characteristics, and translating to clinical studies for guidance of prostate cancer therapy.

Siewerdsen joined the Ontario Cancer Institute and University of Toronto Department of Medical Biophysics as a scientist and assistant professor, respectively, in 2002, and subsequently as senior scientist and associate professor in 2007. Research in his laboratory focused on image-guided surgery, new imaging methods such as dual-energy imaging, and image registration. His work involved the development of early systems for cone beam computed tomography (CBCT) with a flat-panel detector on mobile C-arms for image-guided surgery and translated the first such systems to clinical studies in image-guided Otolaryngology–Head and Neck Surgery with Dr. Jonathan Irish. He also collaborated closely with Dr. Kristy Brock on deformable image registration using the Demons algorithm and with Dr. Narinder Paul on development of dual-energy chest radiography systems for detection of early stage lung cancer.

His research also extended cascaded systems models for x-ray imaging performance to describe 3D imaging performance in CBCT and helped to establish mathematical methods for imaging system optimization according to the imaging task. Siewerdsen joined Johns Hopkins Biomedical Engineering as an associate professor in 2009 and subsequently as a professor in 2012, with cross-appointment in Computer Science, Radiology, and Neurosurgery. He founded the I-STAR Lab (Imaging for Surgery, Therapy, and Radiology) as a collaborative research endeavor bridging biomedical engineering with clinical collaborators at Johns Hopkins Hospital. In 2015, he established the Carnegie Center for Surgical Innovation in the Johns Hopkins School of Medicine. He was also a John C. Malone Professor in Computer Science and Member of the Malone Center for Engineering in Healthcare. Research in Siewerdsen's laboratory includes: mathematical modeling / imaging science of digital x-ray, dual-energy imaging, cone beam computed tomography (CBCT), and computed tomography (CT) systems; image-guided surgery; multi-modality medical image registration; new imaging systems for musculoskeletal radiology and orthopedic surgery; and clinical research collaborations in robot-assisted surgery and data science related to medical imaging.

In 2022, Siewerdsen joined The University of Texas MD Anderson Cancer as a Professor Imaging Physics, Radiation Physics, and Neurosurgery, where he directs the Surgical Data Science Program in the Institute for Data Science in Oncology.

Notable scientific contributions from Siewerdsen's work include:

- Cone beam computed tomography (CBCT) systems on mobile C-arms for image-guided surgery.
- Cone beam computed tomography (CBCT) systems for imaging of the weight-bearing foot, ankle, and knee with high spatial resolution and low radiation dose.
- Cone beam computed tomography (CBCT) systems for image-guided radiation therapy (IGRT).
- Cone beam computed tomography (CBCT) systems for high-quality, low-dose imaging of intracranial hemorrhage.
- Influence of x-ray Compton scattering in cone beam computed tomography (CBCT).
- Image registration methods for minimally invasive spine surgery.
- Image registration methods for Otolaryngology–Head and Neck Surgery.
- Mathematical models of 3D imaging performance in cone beam computed tomography (CBCT).
- Mathematical models of spectral and phase-contrast imaging performance for photon counting x-ray detectors.
- Mathematical models of 2D imaging performance for flat-panel detectors.
- Software tools for x-ray spectrum modeling (spektr).
