= Kathleen E. Cullen =

Biomedical Engineer

- Education: Brown University; University of Chicago
- Known for: Research on brain's processing of vestibular information and balance
- Scientific career
- Fields: Biomedical engineering, Neuroscience
- Workplaces: Johns Hopkins University
- Doctoral advisor: Robert A. McCrea; Jay M. Goldberg

Kathleen E. Cullen is an American–Canadian biomedical engineer and neuroscientist. She is known for her work combining computational and systems neuroscience to understand how the brain encodes and processes self-motion (vestibular) information to ensure the maintenance of balance and stable perception. Her research also focuses on extending this knowledge to further advance the development of novel diagnostic tools, treatments, training, and rehabilitative strategies for patients.

Cullen is the Raj and Neera Singh Professor of Biomedical Engineering, and professor of Neuroscience and Otolaryngology at Johns Hopkins University. She is the co-director of the Center for Hearing and Balance at the Whiting School of Engineering and Johns Hopkins School of Medicine. She is also the current president for the Society for the Neural Control of Movement and served on the steering committee for NASA’s Decadal Survey on Biological and Physical Sciences Research in Space 2023-2032.

== Education ==
Cullen completed a B.S. degree in neuroscience and biomedical engineering at Brown University in 1984 and a Ph.D. at the University of Chicago in 1991 with Robert A. McCrea and Jay M. Goldberg.

== Career ==
Cullen was a postdoctoral fellow at the Montreal Neurological Institute of McGill University from 1991 to 1993. In 1994, she joined the Department of Physiology at McGill University as an assistant professor, with concurrent appointments in Biomedical Engineering, Neuroscience, and Otolaryngology. She became an associate professor in 2000 and a full professor in 2006. While at McGill, Cullen was also director of McGill's Aerospace Medical Research Unit and on the Scientific Advisory Board of the NASA-associated National Space Biomedical Research Institute (NSBRI, USA). In 2016, Cullen moved to Johns Hopkins University, where she is currently a professor in biomedical engineering and maintains joint appointments in the Departments of Neuroscience and Otolaryngology–Head and Neck Surgery.
