= John B. Whitehead =

Academic engineer (1872–1954)

- Born: August 18, 1872; Norfolk, Virginia, U.S.
- Died: November 16, 1954 (aged 82); Baltimore, Maryland, U.S.
- Education: Johns Hopkins University
- Awards: Elliott Cresson Medal (1932); IEEE Edison Medal (1941)
- Scientific career
- Fields: Electrical engineering
- Workplaces: Johns Hopkins University

John Boswell Whitehead (August 18, 1872 – November 16, 1954) was an American electrical engineer and a professor at Johns Hopkins University as well as the dean of the School of Engineering. Whitehead was president of the American Institute of Electrical Engineers from 1933 to 1934. In 1941, Whitehead received the IEEE Edison Medal for "contributions to the field of electrical engineering, his pioneering and development in the field of dielectric research, and his achievements in the advancement of engineering education".
