= Elliot McVeigh =

Elliot R. McVeigh
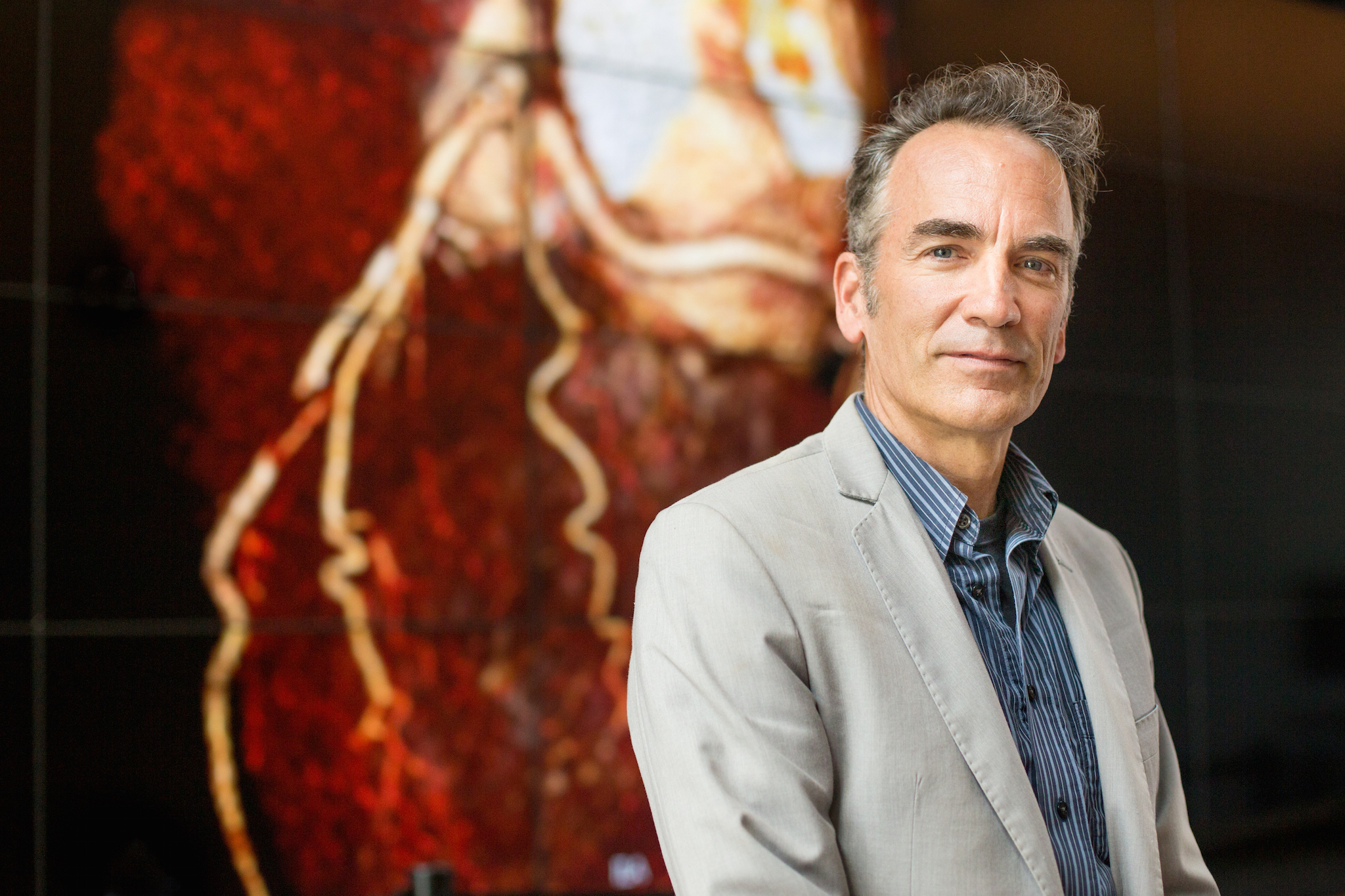
- Born: March 1, 1960 (age 66)
- Citizenship: American
- Education: University of Toronto
- Scientific career
- Fields: Bioinformatics; Medical imaging
- Workplaces: University of California, San Diego; Johns Hopkins University; University of Toronto
- Thesis: (1988)
- Doctoral advisor: Michael Bronskill Ph.D
- Website: cvil.ucsd.edu

Elliot R. McVeigh is a professor of bioengineering, Medicine and Radiology at the University of California, San Diego (UCSD). His research utilises low dose CT imaging and MR imaging techniques to identify those people at substantially higher risk for heart attacks.

== Education ==
McVeigh earned a BSc in physics in 1984 and a PhD in medical biophysics in 1988 at the University of Toronto.

== Career ==
In 2007 he returned to Johns Hopkins to become the director of the Department of Biomedical Engineering. During his 8-year tenure as chair the department grew substantially and was continuously ranked #1 in the nation for both undergraduate and graduate training by U.S. News & World Report. He also led the development of a new Master's program for medical device design through the establishment of the Center of Biomedical Innovation and Design in the department.

In 2015, he was hired by University of California, San Diego with a joint appointment in the school of engineering and the school of medicine. He is part of the Altman Clinical and Translational Research Institute (ACTRI) built by UC San Diego in La Jolla. In the Cardiovascular Imaging Lab (CViL) at UCSD, McVeigh and his team work with engineers and clinicians to develop low dose CT imaging and MR imaging techniques that will identify those people at substantially higher risk for heart attacks.

== Activities and Honors ==
- Fellow of American Institute for Medical and Biological Engineering, 2008
- Fellows Award for Research Mentoring, National Institutes of Health, 2007
- Regional Excellence in Tech Transfer Award, Federal Laboratory Consortium, 2005
- Fellow, International Society of Magnetic Resonance in Medicine, 2001
- Established Investigator Award, American Heart Association, 1995 - 1999
- Scholar, Radiological Society of North America, 1990

== Selected publications ==
Pourmorteza K, Schuleri D, Herzka AL, McVeigh E (2012). "A New Method for Cardiac Computed Tomography Regional Function Assessment: Stretch Quantifier for Endocardial Engraved Zones (SQUEEZ)". Circulation: Cardiovascular Imaging. 5 (2): 243–250. doi:10.1161/CIRCIMAGING.111.970061. PMC 7720848. PMID 22342945.

Kellman P, Epstein FH, McVeigh ER (2001). "Adaptive sensitivity encoding incorporating temporal filtering (TSENSE)". Magnetic Resonance in Medicine. 45 (5): 846–52. doi:10.1002/mrm.1113. PMID 11323811. S2CID 25651304.

Prinzen FW, Hunter WC, Wyman BT, McVeigh ER (1999). "Mapping of regional myocardial strain and work during ventricular pacing: experimental study using magnetic resonance imaging tagging". Journal of the American College of Cardiology. 33 (6): 846–52. doi:10.1016/s0735-1097(99)00068-6. PMC 2041911. PMID 10334450.

Lederman RJ, Guttman MA, Peters DC, Thompson RB, Sorger JM, Dick AJ, Raman VK, McVeigh ER (1999). "Catheter-based endomyocardial injection with real-time magnetic resonance imaging". Circulation. 105 (11): 1282–4. doi:10.1161/circ.105.11.1282. PMC 1317571. PMID 11901036.

McVeigh ER, Guttman MA, Lederman RJ, Li M, Kocaturk O, Hunt T, Kozlov S, Horvath KA (2006). "Real-time interactive MRI-guided cardiac surgery: Aortic valve replacement using a direct apical approach". Magnetic Resonance in Medicine. 56 (5): 958–964. doi:10.1002/mrm.21044. PMC 1963465. PMID 17036300.
