= Karl Schlesinger =

Austrian-Hungarian economist and banker (1889–1938)

Karl Schlesinger (January 19, 1889 – March 12, 1938) was an Austrian-Hungarian economist and banker.

He was born in Budapest. He studied law and economics at the University of Vienna, obtaining a doctorate under Eugene von Böhm-Bawerk in 1914. Schlesinger's work, which made significant use of mathematics, would go on to be influential, but it was not received well by his fellow contemporary Austrian economists.

He moved from Budapest to Vienna 1919, escaping Bela Kun's communist revolution. He established a bank in Vienna. He participated in Ludwig von Mises's Austrian economics seminar. He hired Karl Menger as his tutor in mathematics in 1931 and hired Abraham Wald in 1932 as his tutor.

He committed suicide on March 12, 1938, as he expected persecution by the Nazis with Anschluss, Nazi Germany's annexation of Austria. Schlesinger was Jewish.
