= Raimond L. Winslow =

Raimond Winslow
- Born: 1955 (age 70–71)
- Education: Worcester Polytechnic Institute; Johns Hopkins University
- Scientific career
- Workplaces: Johns Hopkins University; University of Minnesota; Washington University in St. Louis
- Thesis: A Quantitative Analysis of Rate-Coding in the Auditory Nerve (1986)
- Doctoral advisor: Murray B. Sachs
- Website: winslow-webpage

Raimond L. Winslow (born 1955) is an American biomedical engineer and computational biologist.

He earned his B.S. from Worcester Polytechnic Institute. He enrolled at Johns Hopkins University, where he was awarded a Ph.D. in Biomedical Engineering in 1986. He completed his training at the Institute for Biomedical Computing and Department of Neurology at Washington University School of Medicine.

In 2003, Winslow was recognized by IBM as a winner of the IBM Life Sciences Institutes of Innovation Award.

In 2005, Winslow was appointed director of the Johns Hopkins Institute for Computational Medicine. In 2010 Winslow was named the Raj and Neera Singh Professor for his accomplishments as an interdisciplinary researcher and pioneer in the field of computational medicine.
