= The Whiting-Turner Contracting Company =

American construction company

Coordinates: 39.402235°N 76.597218°W

- Type: Private
- Industry: Construction management
- Founded: 1909; 117 years ago
- Founders: G.W.C. Whiting and LeBaron Turner
- Headquarters: 300 East Joppa, Baltimore, Maryland 21286, United States
- Area served: United States
- Key people: Tim Regan (president & CEO); Tony Moag (COO)
- Services: Construction Management, General Contracting
- Revenue: $8.7 billion (2021)
- Number of employees: 4,227 (2022)
- Website: www.whiting-turner.com

The Whiting-Turner Contracting Company is one of the largest employee-owned general contractors and construction management companies in the United States. Whiting-Turner is headquartered in Baltimore, Maryland, and has over 60 locations nationwide.

The company is frequently included in the Top 10 of the Engineering News-Record's annual Top 400 contractors, and averages upwards of $10 billion USD (United States dollar) in revenue annually. With over 4,000 employees, Whiting-Turner is also considered one of the largest private companies in the United States.

== History ==
In 1909, MIT classmates G.W.C. Whiting and LeBaron Turner founded The Whiting-Turner Contracting Company. The company's first project was utility and road work at Walter Reed General Hospital in Washington, DC. Despite starting around the same time and having a similar name as competitor Turner Construction, which started in 1902, Whiting-Turner has always been its own completely separate company.

In 1938, Willard Hackerman joined the company as an engineer shortly after graduating from Johns Hopkins University. Seventeen years later, in 1955, Hackerman would be named Whiting-Turner's second president. Hackerman remained with the firm for over 75 years until he died in 2014.

Following Willard Hackerman's death, Timothy Regan was named the company's third president and CEO. Regan joined the firm in 1980 as an engineer and currently remains in that position.

== Notable projects ==
In 2007, Whiting-Turner was awarded a $134.4-million contract to build the United States Marine Forces Special Operations Command 500-acre, 37-building complex at Camp Lejeune in North Carolina.

In 2011, the company completed construction of the NASA Langley Research Center Headquarters, for which it won several awards for green building.

In June of 2013, Whiting-Turner completed a $100 million renovation of the Kennedy Space Center Visitor Complex, designed by PGAV Architects out of Kansas.

In 2015, the firm finished construction of the $87 million McMurtry Building at Stanford University. The 96,000 square foot building houses the university's Art History Department and the Art and Architecture Library on campus and was designed by Diller Scofidio + Renfro.

In 2016, renovations of the University of Virginia's historic rotunda were completed by Whiting-Turner. The building was originally built in 1826 and was designed by Thomas Jefferson. The Rotunda is the focal point of the University of Virginia's campus and is represented in the university's logo.

In 2019, Whiting-Turner completed the 250,000-square-foot renovation of the newly renamed Rocket Mortgage FieldHouse, home of the Cleveland Cavaliers. The $185 million renovation was funded by a 50-50 private/public funding agreement between the city of Cleveland and the Cavaliers organization.

In 2022, the firm was awarded a $173 million contract to renovate a building in Suitland, Maryland where the Bureau of Labor Statistics national office will move in 2024-2025 to be on the same campus as the headquarters of the U.S. Census Bureau and the Bureau of Economic Analysis.

The firm is the general contractor for Under Armour's new global headquarters in the Port Covington neighborhood of Baltimore, Maryland. The new facility will feature an NCAA-regulation track and field facility, retail outlets, and a 280,000-square-foot cross-laminated mass timber office building. The project is a multi-billion-dollar endeavor expected to be completed in early 2025.

Whiting-Turner also leads the $5 Billion John Palmour Manufacturing Center for Silicon Carbine project in Siler City, North Carolina. The 445-acre facility will produce silicon carbide wafers needed to make silicon carbide chips for many electronics and electric vehicles. The project, which is expected to be completed in 2030, is funded in part by the CHIPS and Science Act signed by President Joe Biden.
