= T.E. Schlesinger =

American engineer and physicist

Tuviah Ehud Schlesinger is an American engineer and physicist and since January 2014 has served as the Benjamin T. Rome Dean of the Whiting School of Engineering at Johns Hopkins University. Previously he was the David Edward Schramm Professor of Electrical and Computer Engineering at Carnegie Mellon University's college of engineering, where he was also department head of electrical and computer engineering (2005-2013). At Carnegie Mellon he served as the director of the DARPA Center for MEMS Instrumented Self-Configuring Integrated Circuits (MISCIC), was the founding director of the General Motors Collaborative Research Lab, was associate head of ECE (1996-2003), and was the director of the Data Storage Systems Center (2004-2005).

== Biography ==
T.E. Schlesinger received his BSc in physics from the University of Toronto in 1980, his MS in applied physics from the California Institute of Technology in 1983, and his PhD in applied physics, also from Caltech, in 1985. His research interests are in the areas of solid-state electronic and optical devices, nanotechnology, and information storage systems. His work and the work of his students are of direct interest to a number of industrial partners with whom he has collaborated on a number of projects resulting in practical implementations of his work. His work has focused in particular on Heat Assisted Magnetic Recording, Room Temperature Nuclear Radiation Detector Technology, and Reconfigurable RF Circuits.

== Awards and Service ==
The Carnegie Institute of Technology George Tallman Ladd Award for research, the Carnegie Institute of Technology Benjamin Richard Teare Award for teaching, Presidential Young Investigator Award, 1998 R&D 100 Award for his work on electro-optic device technology, 1999 R&D 100 Award for his work on nuclear detectors, the Carnegie Science Center 1998 "Scientist" award. He is a Fellow of the IEEE and the SPIE, was President and Senior Past President of the ECE Department Heads' Association and served on its board of directors. In 2014 he received the Robert M. Janowiak Outstanding Leadership and Service Award from ECEDHA. He has served as a member of the International Advisory Panel for the A*STAR Graduate Academy in Singapore and was on the Advisory Board for the ECE Department, Georgia Tech and the Technology Commercialization Advisory Board for Innovation Works. He currently serves on the State of Maryland's P-20 Leadership Council.

== Academic Leadership ==
In his role in academic leadership at Carnegie Mellon he helped in the development of numerous international collaborative programs most notably in China, Singapore, Portugal and Rwanda. He has advocated for a collaborative approach to research and education and often has spoken on the need to blur academic boundaries most notable between Electrical and Computer Engineering.
