= Willard Hackerman =

American businessman

- Born: October 6, 1918; Baltimore, Maryland
- Died: February 10, 2014 (aged 95); Baltimore, Maryland
- Occupations: CEO, Engineer, philanthropist
- Spouse: Lillian Patz
- Children: Steven Hackerman; Nancy Hackerman

Willard Hackerman (October 6, 1918 – February 10, 2014) was an American businessman, long-time CEO of major construction firm Whiting-Turner, and philanthropist based in Baltimore, Maryland.

== Biography ==
Willard Hackerman was president and CEO of The Whiting-Turner Contracting Company and a prominent Baltimore philanthropist. Hackerman grew up in Baltimore and attended the Baltimore Polytechnic Institute, a public high school known for its engineering program. He graduated from the Johns Hopkins University, where he studied civil engineering. In 1938 he started his career at Whiting-Turner where he worked until his death in 2014. Upon his death the Baltimore Sun said that while he held no public office, he was as much a city father to Baltimore as any mayor or City Council member, delegate or senator. "Few, if any, have had a larger impact on the community." Hackerman was influential in politics, being close ally of Baltimore mayor and later Maryland governor William Shaefer.

== Whiting-Turner Contracting Company ==
Virtually his entire working life of 75 years Hackerman was the head of The Whiting-Turner Contracting Company. Major projects of the company included Baltimore's Convention Center, Harborplace and its aquarium In 2020 it was #37 on Forbes Magazine's List of America's Largest Private Companies, when it had US$10.3 billion in revenues and 4,090 employees.

== Philanthropy ==
He personally or through his company, made a number of significant philanthropic gifts. Through his company, Whiting Turner, he gave over a million dollars to Catholic schools primarily for tuition assistance scholarships. The G.W.C. Whiting School of Engineering at Johns Hopkins University received a $5 million gift in 2005 to endow a scholarship fund for graduates. Hackerman and his wife Lillian Patz Hackerman, endowed the Willard and Lillian Hackerman Chair in Radiation Oncology at the Johns Hopkins School of Medicine, the Willard and Lillian Hackerman Chair in Engineering at the University of Maryland, Baltimore County (UMBC), and created the Hackerman-Patz Patient and Family Pavilion at the Sidney Kimmel Comprehensive Cancer Center. There are also other endowments in his name such as the Willard Hackerman Scholarship and the Willard Hackerman Academy of Mathematics and Science at Towson University. Hackerman owned a collection of significant antique Maryland and Baltimore maps. In 2017, after his death his family presented the Hackerman Map Collection of about 60 from between the 16th and mid-19th centuries to the Sheridan libraries of Johns Hopkins University.

The Hackermans also purchased a Mount Vernon Place mansion and donated it to the Walters Art Museum, upon which it was renamed Hackerman House Walters Art Museum#Hackerman House (1850/1991) which now includes the museum's collection of Asian art. In 2010, the Levindale Hebrew Geriatric Center and Hospital began $31 million construction project to which Willard Hackerman pledged $5 million. He was a Charter Member of Support for the National Archives Experience with a gift of $1,000,000 or more
