= IEEE Transactions on Neural Systems and Rehabilitation Engineering =

- Discipline: Neural engineering, biomedical engineering, rehabilitation engineering
- Language: English
- Edited by: He Huang

Publication details
- Former name: IEEE Transactions on Rehabilitation Engineering (1993—2001)
- History: 1993-present
- Publisher: IEEE
- Frequency: Continuous
- Open access: Yes
- License: Creative Commons licenses
- Impact factor: 5.2 (2024)

Standard abbreviations
- ISO 4: IEEE Trans. Neural Syst. Rehabil. Eng.

Indexing
- ISSN: 1534-4320 (print); 1558-0210 (web)
- LCCN: 2001214203

Links
- Journal homepage; Online access; Online archive

IEEE Transactions on Neural Systems and Rehabilitation Engineering is a peer-reviewed and open-access scientific journal published by the IEEE. The journal covers advances in neural engineering and biomedical engineering with a focus on rehabilitation engineering. Its editor-in-chief is He Huang (North Carolina State University).

The journal was established in 1993 under the title IEEE Transactions on Rehabilitation Engineering, before being renamed to its current title in 2001.

== Abstracting and indexing ==
The journal is abstracted and indexed in:

- Current Contents/Electronics & Telecommunications Collection
- Directory of Open Access Journals
- EBSCO databases
- Ei Compendex
- Inspec
- MEDLINE
- ProQuest databases
- Science Citation Index Expanded
- Scopus

According to the Journal Citation Reports, the journal has a 2024 impact factor of 5.2.
