= Slezak =

Origin
- Origin: Czech language
- Meaning: derived from slezsko, meaning "Silesia"
- Region of origin: Silesia

Other names
- Variant forms: Slezák, Ślęzak and Ślężak

Slezak is a Czech, Slovak and Polish surname, which originally meant a person from Silesia, derived from the Czech word slezsko. Variants of the name include Ślązak, Slezák, Ślęzak, Slenzak, Szlezák, and Szlazak. The name may refer to:

- Dalibor Slezák (born 1970), Czech football player
- Erika Slezak (born 1946), American actress
- Janusz Ślązak (1907–1985), Polish rower
- Jim Slezak (born 1966), American politician
- John Slezak (1896–1984), American businessman
- Katarina Krpež Slezak (born 1988), Serbian handballer
- Leo Slezak (1873–1946), Czech opera singer
- Margarete Slezak (1901–1953), Austrian actress
- Ron Slenzak (born 1948), American photographer
- Victor Slezak (born 1957), American actor
- Walter Slezak (1902–1983), Austrian actor
- Zoltán Szlezák (born 1967), Hungarian footballer
